= Age regression in hypnotherapy =

Controversial therapy technique

Age regression in hypnotherapy is a controversial psycho-therapeutic process that claims to facilitate access to childhood memories, thoughts, and feelings.

The notion of age regression is central to the pseudoscientific attachment therapy, whose proponents believe that a child who has missed out on their developmental stages can be made to experience those stages at a later age by a variety of techniques. Many of these techniques are intensely physical and confrontational, and include forced holding of eye contact, sometimes while being required to access traumatic memories of past neglect or abuse. Extreme emotions such as rage or fear may be simultaneously induced.

== Definition ==
Age regression in therapy is also referred to as hypnotic age regression. This is a hypnosis technique claimed by hypnotherapists to help patients remember the perceptions and feelings caused by past events that have had an effect on their present illness. A person is hypnotized and is instructed to recall a past event or regress to an earlier age. The patient may then proceed to recall or relive events in their life. If the hypnotherapist suggests that the patient is of a certain age, the patient may begin to appear to talk, act, and think in ways appropriate to said age. This allows for the patient to reinterpret their current situation with new information and insight. They may be guided to experience hypermnesia which is recalling the experience in vivid detail, or to experience revivification which is the reliving of the experience.

Each age regression session can vary based on the hypnotherapist and patient. Having a prior understanding of hypnosis and regression prepares a patient better for age regression therapy and can help the patient to better take to the treatment. The use of a quality hypnotherapist who builds a relationship with the client can be beneficial to the effectiveness of the hypnosis.

== Purpose ==
The purpose of hypnotic age regression is to reframe the negative feelings and perceptions of the past to facilitate progress towards the patient's goals. It allows patients to find the cause of their current blocks and eliminate their past traumas. When patients are hypnotized, they are in an altered state that allows for their subconscious mind to be accessed. The subconscious mind holds the behaviors and habits that people exhibit to protect them. These behaviors and habits are repeated until they are not necessary any more. Hypnotic age regression allows for patients to reframe and purge their unnecessary behaviors.

== False memories ==
Whether hypnotic age regression leads to more accurate earlier memories, or if the memories are real at all, is heavily debated. The question of whether people should utilize hypnosis to recall memories of early trauma is very controversial.

Psychological research shows that interviews can be carried out in a way that people can easily acquire false memories.

Joseph Green, a professor at Ohio University, conducted a study on hypnotherapy and false memories. In the study, 48 students who had been shown to be highly susceptible to hypnosis were divided into two groups. Before they were hypnotized, 32 of the students were warned that hypnosis could lead to false memories and could not bring up memories that the individual could not recall consciously. The remaining 16 students were not given such a warning.

Then the students were asked to select an uneventful night from the previous week—a night they had uninterrupted sleep, uninfluenced by alcohol or drugs, and without any dreams that they could recall. During hypnosis, the students were asked if they had heard a loud noise at 4 A.M. that uneventful night. After hypnosis, they were asked if they recalled hearing a loud noise at 4 A.M. during the night in question. Twenty-eight percent of the forewarned students and forty-four percent of those who were not warned about false memories claimed that they had heard such a noise. "The results suggest that warnings are helpful to some extent in discouraging pseudomemories," Green said, adding, "Warnings did not prevent pseudomemories and did not reduce the confidence subjects had in those memories."

In a separate study Green conducted with the help of three students at Ohio State, 160 students were divided into three groups. One underwent self-hypnosis and another deep relaxation, while a third did counting exercises. All of them were told that the regimen would help them recall their earliest memories. Forty percent of those in the hypnosis group later recalled a memory of something that occurred on or before their first birthday. Similar recollections were reported by only 22 percent of those in the relaxation group and 13 percent in the counting group.

== See also ==
- Confabulation – Recall of fabricated, misinterpreted or distorted memories
- Confirmation bias – Bias confirming existing attitudes
- Developmental stage theories – Stages of human child development
- False allegation of child sexual abuse – Accusation of child molestation when it has not actually occurred
- False memory syndrome – Proposed condition of false or biased recollections
- Ideomotor phenomenon (ideomotor responding to questions in hypnotherapy) – Concept in hypnosis and psychological research
- Imagination inflation – Type of memory distortion
- Lost in the mall technique – Memory implantation technique
- Memory errors – Error caused by a memory fault
- Memory implantation – Psychological technique
- Misinformation effect – Effect of later events on a previous memory
- Recovered-memory therapy – Scientifically discredited form of psychotherapy
- Repressed memory – Theory that memory may be stored in the unconscious mind
- Regression (psychology) – Mental defence mechanism in psychoanalysis
