= Misattribution of memory =

Misidentification during memory recall

In psychology, the misattribution of memory or source misattribution is the misidentification of the origin of a memory by the person making the memory recall. Misattribution is likely to occur when individuals are unable to monitor and control the influence of their attitudes toward their judgments at the time of retrieval. Misattribution is divided into three components: cryptomnesia, false memories, and source confusion. It was originally noted as one of Daniel Schacter's seven sins of memory.

== Components of misattribution ==
=== Cryptomnesia ===
Cryptomnesia is a form of misattribution. It involves the unconscious influence of memory that causes current thoughts to be wrongfully attributed as novel. In other words, individuals mistakenly believe that they are the original generators of the thought. When cryptomnesia arises in literature or scholarly ideas it is often termed 'inadvertent plagiarism,' inadvertent because the subject genuinely believes the idea to be their own creation. Inadvertent plagiarism takes two forms. The first involves the plagiarizer regenerating a previously seen idea but believing the idea to be novel. In the second form, the plagiarizer recalls the ideas of other author's as their own. For example, a person may falsely recall creating an idea, thought, or joke, not intentionally engaging in plagiarism, but nevertheless believing it to be the original source of memory.

=== False memory ===
False memories are memories that individuals believe and recall as true that, in fact, never occurred. Often, people form false memories for details of events after hearing others mistakenly report information about an event. For example, participants who watch a video of a crime featuring a blue car but hear the car misleadingly referred to as white after the fact may create a false memory of a white car present at the scene of the crime, rather than a blue one. False memories can range from small details about an event to entire events that never happened, such as being lost in a crowded shopping mall as a child.

=== Source confusion ===
Source confusion is an attribute seen in different people's accounts of the same event after hearing people speak about the situation. An example of this would be a witness who heard a police officer say he had a gun, and then that witness later says they saw the gun. Understanding the source of one's memories is important to memory processes necessary for everyday living. Memories arise both from perceptual experiences and from one's thoughts, feelings, inferences, and imagination. Source monitoring theory postulates that memory errors occur when perceptual information is incorrectly attributed as being the source of a past experience. This may take place because one event shares the characteristics of another source. When a person has many sources of perceptual information about an event, their brain is easily able to evoke a memory of that event, even if they did not experience it, thus creating a misattributed memory.

In one particular case of source confusion, a female rape survivor falsely accused a memory doctor of being her rapist. In this case, the doctor had made a television appearance seen by the female survivor prior to her attack. The woman misattributed the doctor's face to that of her attacker. An additional example of source confusion involves Ronald Reagan. In this instance, Ronald Reagan tells a story about a heroic pilot to whom he personally awarded a medal. However, he was actually recalling the storyline from a theatrical production entitled "Wing and a Prayer". However, he strongly believed that he was involved in the medal process for this war hero.

== Causes ==
Frontal and temporal lobe location in the human brain

=== Cognitive causes ===
==== Causes of cryptomnesia ====
Cryptomnesia is a source-monitoring error in which people often have difficulty determining whether a concept was internally generated or experienced externally. People occasionally misattribute the creation of a novel thought or idea as their own, when in fact they are retrieving it from a previous experience. Some individuals fail to establish memories with enough detail to generate a source attribution, causing a misattribution of memory to the wrong source. People often truly believe that the information they plagiarized was actually that of their own.

Unintentional plagiarism is greater for information generated by others than ourselves. Researchers believe this may due to having better memory and associations for words we generate, as self-generated information is better remembered later. Moreover, cryptomnesia increases when information is generated by others before a self-generated idea. This may be due to the likelihood that people were thinking of their next response, rather than processing the source of the information.

==== Causes of false memories ====
False recognition can occur as the result of making an implicit associative response, an automatic association between two concepts in memory. It is believed that associative responses never come to conscious attention, thus the activation of the concept is assumed to be implicit. An implicit associative response has shown to arise when seeing a word such as "car", might cause people to unconsciously think of an associative such as "truck". If the word truck is later presented to them, they may state they recognize seeing the item when they had actually generated it themselves. It is believed that the activation from the shown word may also activate the associative word, allowing the information to be easily accessible to the mind. Research has also shown that the more similar the presented and associative words are, or the more similar list items there are, the more likely it is that a false recognition error will be made.

Gist-based similarity, the robust encoding of semantic information rather than distinctive encoding, is another cause of false recognition. When studying a list of numerous related words, there is a high level of semantic overlap between memory items. The inability to keep each concepts separate and distinct from one another makes it difficult to recollect specific details, subsequently causing people to make responses based on memory gist's rather than specific details. People may form a well-organized idea of what the semantic gist is, and anything that is semantically similar to that idea may be falsely recognized. Gist-based similarity has also been shown to occur in circumstances in which implicit associative responses are an unlikely source of misattribution. The false recognition error also becomes evident when a time pressure is presented during a recognition decision. Processes that work to discover a source for the basis of recognition take time to execute, as a result of a lack of time, false recognitions errors are made more often.

Fuzzy-trace theory, an opposing theory to source monitoring error, stipulates that memories are composed of two components; gist and verbatim traces. Verbatim traces are the surface details of physical stimuli, which encompass the clear visual images and source information of an experience. Though both traces are encoded simultaneously, they are stored in separate regions of the brain, allowing for each trace to posse a distinct lifespan. Verbatim traces, though readily available when a memory is first encoded, deteriorate quickly. Fuzzy-trace theory thus proposes that misattributed memories arise due to the short lifespan of verbatim traces, being that the quality of source information is rapidly declining. The misattribution of memory is therefore more likely to occur as the time between the encoding of an experience and the recall of the subsequent memory increases.

It has also been noted that misattribution may be a product of adaptive features of memory, rather than a product of a flaw in the memory system. The misattribution error often leads to conclusions of an inefficient memory system, however some researchers believe that the error is a cost associated with the benefits of a functioning and adequate memory system. The misattribution error reflects an adaptive memory system in which information that does not require people to remember all the specific details is lost. Specific details would only be preserved in situations where the specific details need to be remembered, such as memories of a highly emotional experience. The use of semantic gists may be a fundamental mechanism of memory, allowing people to categorize information and generalize across situations, a function associated with higher intelligence.

=== Neurological causes ===
==== Neurological basis of false recognition ====
Brain-damaged patients have provided useful insights into the underlying biological mechanisms involved in false recognition. Results from studies comparing levels of false recognition between patients with frontal lobe damage and age-matched controls, showed a significantly higher level of false recognition amongst the frontal lobe damaged individuals. The damage is believed to have caused disruptions in the adequate encoding of item-specific details or caused defective retrieval monitoring processes. These types of processes are needed to accurately recall the origins of memory representations, and without them, errors of origin can be made. Studies of false recognition in amnesic patients with damage to either the medial temporal lobe or other diencephalon structures, have demonstrated that the same processes involved in accurate recognition, are also involved in false recognition. These cortices play a role in strategic monitoring processing, as they attempt to examine other cortical outputs. If these cortices were damaged, there would be no control over the cortical outputs, increasingly the likelihood of a false recognition error. Additionally, patients with amnesia or Alzheimer's disease have a reduced level of false recognition, believed to be caused by taking too many trials to create the semantic gist information needed for the attribution error.

==== False memories and PET scans ====
A follow-up to the previous research was conducted by Daniel L. Schacter and colleagues. Similar to the study by Henry L. Roediger and Kathleen McDermott, subjects were read a list of associated words before they went into the PET scanner. During the first scan, subjects would make recognition judgments to determine what were the previous presented words. During the second scan, subjects had to make judgments about words that were not presented. For example: bed, rest, dream, tired, and awake would be in the list but not the word "sleep". As with the study by Henry L. Roediger and Kathleen McDermott, subjects claimed to remember similar amounts of non-presented words as they did the words that were actually presented. The researchers noted that brain activity during the true and false recognition tasks were very similar. Monitoring the blood flow in the brain revealed there were in the left medial temporal lobe for both veridical and illusory recognition.

That is not to say that there were not differences. While monitoring blood flow in the brain during false recognition, a part of the frontal lobe that is thought to be a key monitor of memories actually showed greater activity when presented with a false recognition than with a true one. There seemed to be some discrepancy as subjects attempted to scrutinize the out-placed words, but were overcome by powerful memory illusion. This study demonstrates the ability of technology to help researchers understand to a greater extent the power of false memories.

==== Source confusion and FMRI scans ====
T. Awipi and L. Davachi sought to provide evidence of competing subregions in the medial temporal lobe (MTL) that differed on the type of content they encoded. The researchers conducted a study in which subjects were asked to perform an encoding task in a functional magnetic resonance imaging (FMRI) scanner, where they were presented with 192 full colour photographs of scenes (containing a centrally presented novel scene and a smaller image of one of six objects). Participants were also instructed to imagine using the presented object in each scene, and were asked to report whether they were successful. A memory test was administered after participants were removed from the scanner. The test consisted of all previously viewed scenes (old) and an equal number of novel scenes (new). They were asked to make an old/new judgement, and if the scene was responded as being old, they were asked to report it as being "remembered" or "familiar". They were then asked to pick an object that was paired with that scene. The researchers were trying to determine the levels of activation for source recollection for the objects paired with the scene during encoding.

The researchers found that perirhinal cortex activation was greater for objects recalled, and parahippocampal cortex activation was greater when scenes were recalled. The results provide evidence of distinct encoding activation in the subregions of the medial temporal lobe. The first subregion is the perirhinal cortex, which encodes item information. The second subregion, the parahippocampal cortex, is involved in source information. The evidence provides support for the role of the right perirhinal cortex in attributing an object to the right source. As decreased activation was associated with poorer performance, decreased activation of the right perirhinal cortex could be a possible mechanism for source confusion.

== Experimental research ==
=== Misattribution ===
In one of the earliest studies involving misattribution, the Canadian cognitive psychologist Bruce Whittlesea presented subjects with a list of common words. Each word was briefly displayed to the subject. The task required the subject to judge whether a target word was semantically related to any word in the list. Unlike Whittlesea's first experiment involving the recognition of target words, this study involved the manipulation of processing fluency through the conceptual context of the target word, rather than the physical context. After the subjects were given a brief moment to study the list of words, the subjects were presented with sentences that would contain a word that was capitalized at the end of the sentence that would have either been, or not been, from the previously presented list. The word at the end of the sentence was either highly predictable given the context of the sentence, for example: "The stormy seas tossed the BOAT", or the end word was less predictable such as: "She saved her money and bought a LAMP". The subjects were then required to state whether the capitalized end word had appeared, or not, on the previous list of words. If not, they were to respond by saying that the word was "new" versus it being "old".

The study revealed that the new words that were highly predictable were more likely to be incorrectly identified as being previously seen, whereas the new words that were less predictable were not so identified. In fact, subjects actually named predictable words faster than they did unpredictable words. Whittlesea was able to conclude from this study that subjects misattributed their fast responses for highly predictable words as an indication that they had previously experienced the word whereas in fact that was incorrect. As a result, the fluency of processing caused the subjects to misinterpret their quickness as a case of familiarity.

=== Cryptomnesia ===
Some of the most common experimental designs in the study of cryptomnesia involve solving word puzzles. One such study from Stanford University in 1993 monitored subjects' memory for solutions found to a word puzzle game when paired against a computer opponent. After several rounds of generating solutions in turn, participants were asked to generate a list of solutions they provided themselves, or a list of new solutions and rate their confidence in the source of each solution listed. Subjects were more likely to plagiarize solutions given by the computer opponent than their own solutions after indicating that they were very confident that the solution was truly novel; when subjects indicated that they were "guessing" whether the solution had been seen before, they were more likely to duplicate solutions they had found during the first round of the test.

In an extension of this test, after each puzzle solution was generated, participants were asked one of two questions: is this word greater than 3 letters long? (physical judgement) or does this word have a positive connotation? (semantic judgement). Participants then generated lists of solutions as in the first test. While the same correlation of confidence level and error type were seen, participants were much more likely to plagiarize answers after making a physical judgement as compared to a semantic one.

=== False memories ===
==== Deese—Roediger—McDermott Paradigm ====
Researchers Henry L. Roediger and Kathleen McDermott conducted an experiment in 1995 that dealt with a procedure developed by James Deese. This procedure, known as the Deese–Roediger–McDermott paradigm, invites subjects to believe they have experienced a particular word in a given list. The subjects are read a list of associated words by the experimenter. These associated words could be for example: bed, rest, dream, tried, awake, etc. After the subjects have heard these words, they are required to engage in a free recall task in which they must list the words they have heard. The researchers carried out two experiments. The first one involved six lists of associated words. The second experiment involved a wider set of materials, in which twenty-four 15-item lists were read to the subjects.

The results of both experiments demonstrated that the subjects were confident about their incorrect answers regarding words heard in the list. For example, given the list; bed, rest, dream, tired, awake. Many of the subjects heard "sleep" which was not one of the words presented. This false memory effect occurs because the words associated with sleep are in the list leading subjects to believe that the words associated with the words provided in the list have to be right. In fact, with the second experiment the results were 55% false recall rate compared to 40% for the first experiment. This indicated that the more words and lists available the harder it is to actually recall words correctly. This experiment illustrates how subjects can provide false recall without noticing their errors. Even after the researchers indicate that they did not say the mistaken words, subjects still felt very convinced that the researcher had said the word.

==== Implanting a false memory ====
False memories can also be created through leading questioning and simple use of imagination. In 1996, Ira Hyman Jr. and Joel Petland published a study showing that subjects can falsely 'remember' anecdotes from their childhood, based on suggestions from the researcher and corroboration of these fictitious events from family members. Subjects' parents were interviewed to create a list of memorable childhood events (vacations, instances of being lost, etc.), to which one false event was added, namely spilling a bowl of punch at wedding reception. For each event, subjects were provided with several cues to aid in memory (age at the time, location, nature of the event, etc.) and asked to describe the situation in as much detail as possible. If a participant was unable to recall any event, they were asked either to quietly think about the event for about a minute and then provide any additional information remembered (control condition) or imagine the event happening and describe the people who would have been involved, what the location would have looked like and how the event might have occurred (imagery condition).

After three interviews in this fashion, 25% of participants from the imagery condition reported remembering the false situation of spilling the punch bowl, as compared to fewer than 10% of subjects in the control condition. An overall improvement in the detail of responses given and the confidence of those responses was observed for both true and false memories in the imagery condition, while those in the control condition showed much less improvement. While participants who 'remembered' the false situation rated this event as being less emotionally intense than the other remembered true events, participants rated their confidence in accurately remembering the false scenario higher than any of the true events.

In a similar study, researchers convinced participants that they had played a prank on a first grade teacher involving toy slime. In the experimental condition, researchers added self-relevant details to the story (obtained from the participants' parents), such as the name of the participant's first grade teacher and childhood best friend; in other conditions, the participants were told a more generic version of the story. When interviewed, 68.2% of participants in the self-relevant details condition reported mental images and memories of the false event, compared to only 36.4% of participants in the more generic condition. Thus, the presence of specific personal details from a participant's life greatly increase the chance that a false memory is successfully implanted.

=== False memories and flashbulb memories ===
False memories are also related to flashbulb memories, which are memories of one's circumstances during an emotionally charged event. Examples of flashbulb memories include how one remembers learning about the explosion of the Challenger shuttle, the attacks on the World Trade Center on September 11, or any other severely traumatic or outstanding event in a person's life.

Early research done by Brown and Kulik (1977) found that flashbulb memories were similar to photographs because they could be described in accurate, vivid detail. In this study, participants described their circumstances about the moment they learned of the assassination of President John F. Kennedy as well as other similar traumatic events. Participants were able to describe what they were doing, things around them, and other details. However, this data was collected just once, years after the event, and Brown and Kulik were not able to compare the accuracy of those recollections to previous descriptions to see if their memories were indeed comparable to photographs.

Later studies used a research technique called repeated recall to gauge the accuracy of repeated descriptions of traumatic events. Neiser and Harsh (1992) gave participants a questionnaire about the 1986 Challenger explosion at two periods of time: 1) The day after the incident, and 2) Three years later. They found that there were often large discrepancies between the first and second descriptions. For example, many initially reported that they heard the news while sitting in class, but later said that they remember seeing the news on a television broadcast. While the participants were confident in their reports, it became evident that their memories of these emotionally charged events were prone to being manipulated with time, and that false memories of details make their way into memory. One explanation of why false details exist in memories is that people are influenced by life experiences, and they therefore recall memories with insights from other non-related events.

== Applications ==
=== Eyewitness testimony in children ===
In legal testimony, the fact that witnesses are under oath does not preclude the occurrence of unintentional false reports: false memory and cryptomnesia present a significant problem in cases of alleged child abuse, in which the principal witness is already at a memory disadvantage. While individual differences exist, it is widely accepted that young children are highly susceptible to leading questioning and biased interviewing techniques, due to their insufficient cognitive development. A wide variety of studies on the subject have revealed that children become more accurate in their recollections with increasing age and their ability to ignore biased questioning practices increases substantially until age 12. As a result, neutral wording is encouraged where a young child's testimony must be relied upon.

However, the fallibility of children's memories is a complicated issue: memory does not strictly improve over time, but varies in the number of errors made as different skills are developed. Young children are very prone to suggestibility and false memories, even for false story-situations which they provided themselves. This is likely due to memory compensation strategies of imagery and imagination employed at an early age. As children age, other memory strategies such as auditory rehearsal or use of schemas and semantic relationships replace the reliance on imagery, leading to more reliable memories for events, but also presenting greater opportunity for memory errors. By the time children reach high school, memory strategies such as audial rehearsal, schema formation and semantic relatedness become more common; this presents an increased likelihood for memory errors, such as those seen in the Deese–Roediger–McDermott paradigm.

=== Eyewitness testimony in adults ===
As noted, misattribution is likely to occur when individuals are unable to monitor and control the influence of their attitudes at the time of retrieval. Hence, researchers have applied techniques to minimize misattribution by encouraging individuals to focus on distinctive characteristics, rather than on properties that may elicit the influence of personal attitudes. One important question under consideration, is whether people confuse misleading suggestions and personal attitudes for their real memories of a witnessed event. Moreover, misattribution of memory has been especially well investigated in terms of its application to cases of potential eyewitness suggestibility. Currently, researchers have focused on determining the circumstances under which misattribution might occur, and the factors that could increase or decrease these errors, in an eyewitness situation.

In terms of eyewitness testimony, judgements of memory credibility are particularly important in their persuasive impact. At any stage of a legal case, the success or failure of eyewitness persuasion can have consequences. Generally speaking, people assume the testimony of an adult to be more credible and accurate, based on the assumption that adults are better memory reporters. In this context, children are assumed to have poor memory capabilities. Eyewitness testimony in adults differs from that of children in a few other ways. Firstly, adults tend to provide more recalled information, whether accurate or inaccurate, to a legal case. Although, the general pattern is to have an increase the amount of correctly recalled information with age. Lastly, objective questions are more accurately answered with less influence of suggestibility in adults.

=== Source confusion in later life ===
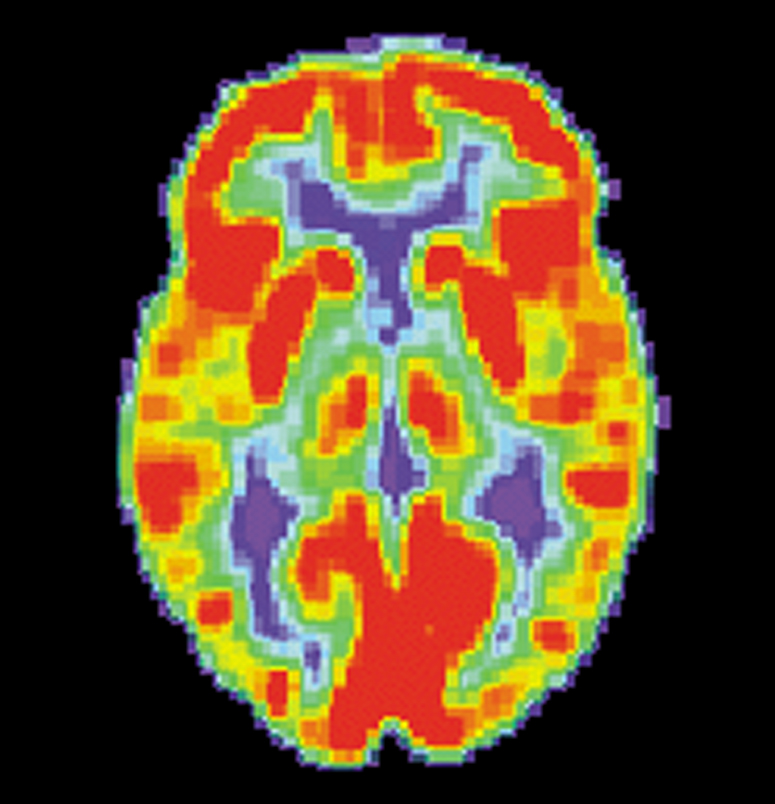
PET normal brain

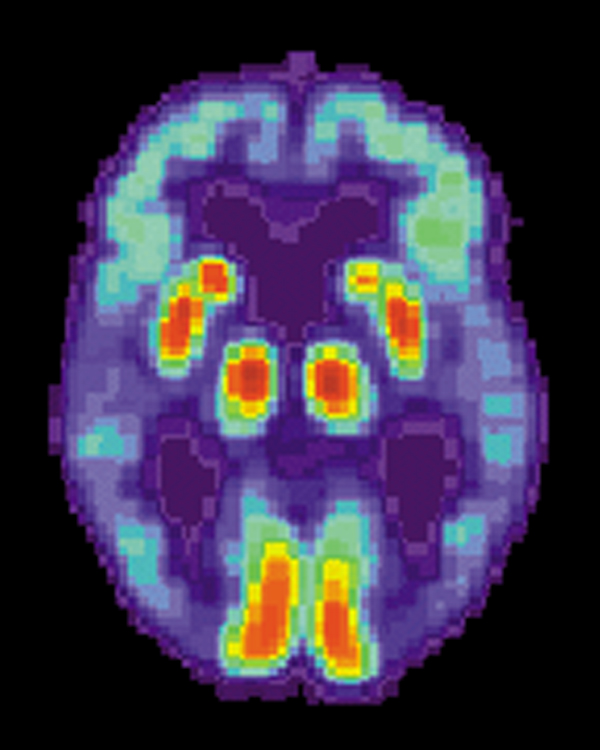
PET Alzheimer's disease

Successful remembering involves recognition that something is familiar and recall of the context in which it was previously experienced. With age, the ability to discriminate between new and previous events begins to fail, and errors in recalling experiences become more common. Larry Jacoby of New York University (1999) demonstrated how common these errors can become, lending a better understanding to why recognition errors are particularly common in Alzheimer's disease. In Jacoby's study, participants were given two lists of words: one to read and one which they would hear read aloud. All subjects were then given a "test" list which contained some words they had read, some they had heard, and some novel words; the subjects had to determine which words were which. Jacoby found that university students and 75-year-olds were equally likely to correctly recognize whether or not the word had been presented, but 75-year-olds were much more likely to mistake whether the word was spoken or read. In other words, while recognition of familiar versus novel words remained relatively stable across age groups, source confusion increased dramatically with age.

Cohen and Faulkner discovered similar age-related source confusion errors ten years earlier when studying short events rather than word lists. Participants were asked to carry out, imagine, or watch a series of short events (placing a fork on top of a plate, putting a pen inside a mug, etc.). They were later asked whether specific events were familiar and how they happened. The study revealed that elderly subjects were more likely than younger subjects to claim that they recognized events that never happened. Additionally, these participants were more likely to say that they watched specific actions occurring when they had actually either imagined them occurring or had never experienced the actions.

These studies show that simply rehearsing material may not always work to improve memory. In the Jacoby study, older adults who read a word several times were likely to accurately judge it as familiar but were then more likely to think they had heard the word read aloud, rather than reading it themselves. Jacoby explains that— because repetition of a word caused recognition to go up but ability to correctly remember the source to go down— recognition and source monitoring are likely separate neurological processes. This may shed some light on the common phenomenon of Alzheimer's patients mistaking frequently presented non-famous faces as being those of celebrities or asking the same question repeatedly. Patients may recognize faces or identify that the subject of the question is important and was discussed recently, but they have no memory for the meaning attached to these common stimuli and so will misattribute this familiarity or simply ask again.
