= Jim Coan =

American academic and neuroscientist

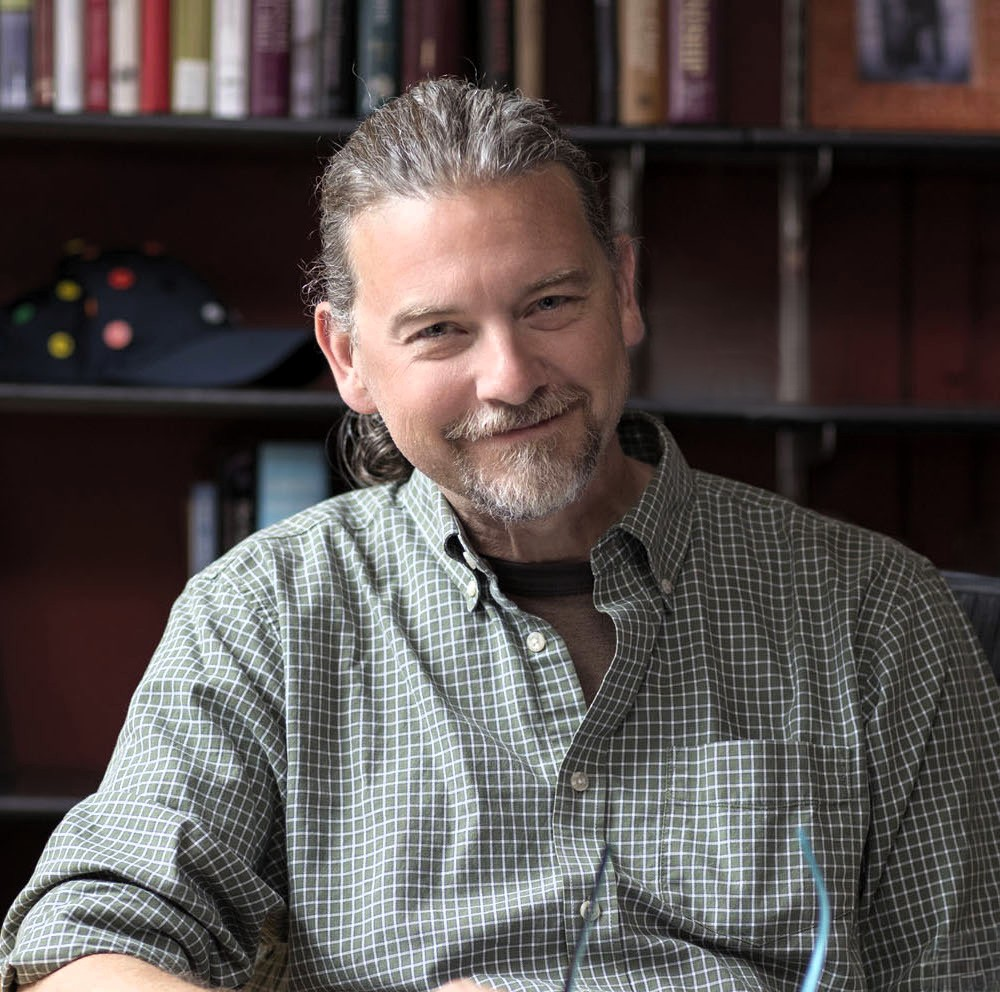
- Born: James Arthur Coan Jr. July 11, 1969 (age 57); Takoma Park, Maryland U.S.A. (need citation)
- Education: Shoreline Community College (AA); University of Washington (BA); University of Arizona (PhD); University of Wisconsin (Post Doc)
- Known for: Lost in the mall technique, Holding-hands research
- Scientific career
- Fields: Neuroscientist, Clinical psychologist
- Workplaces: University of Virginia
- Academic advisors: Elizabeth Loftus, John Gottman, Lee Sechrest and John Allen

James Arthur Coan Jr. (born July 11, 1969) is an American affective neuroscientist, clinical psychologist, writer, and psychology professor at the University of Virginia in Charlottesville, where he serves as director of the Virginia Affective Neuroscience Laboratory.

Coan is known for his work proving memories can be implanted falsely in the Lost in the mall technique. He is known as an authority in interpersonal emotion regulation called social baseline theory because of his work regarding hand-holding to reduce stress and provide a "I am here with you" and "we are here" response in the brain. He is often consulted by the media and the U.S. government when they need information on loneliness, kindness, social isolation, social environments, physical boundaries and the physical and mental health effects of touch. Coan appeared in nine episodes of Brain Games.

== Early life and education ==
Born in Maryland, Coan was the oldest of three children of James Coan Sr. The family moved to Lethbridge Alberta, Canada until Coan was in fifth grade when the family moved to Spokane, Washington where the elder Coan had found employment. Coan recounts that he had a very difficult life growing up though speaking of his father - "He was a tremendously wonderful person who was very seriously traumatized by many things in life, not least the (Vietnam) war." Father, Jim Coan Sr. taught at Renton Technical College in Renton, Washington. He became the Director of the National Society of Professional Surveyors.

When asked in a 2017 interview what person had the most influence on him, Coan said it was his high school German teacher, Judy "Frau" Dufford. She was unique and tough and "spoke to me as if I mattered". Coan had hated school and his community, and was a C or D student. However, when in 1987 Dufford recommended that he travel to Spokane, Washington's sister city in Jilin City China to represent Spokane, he was stunned. That action transformed his "view of the world ... and himself"; Coan came back from that trip changed. He was from a middle-class family, with no plans to attend college, and became the first in his family to do so.

In his first semester at the University of Washington, Coan took a class with Elizabeth Loftus and during an extra credit assignment, he planted a false memory in his younger brother Chris, that he had been lost in the mall. When Loftus read over what Coan had done, she called him into her office. There he found she had called in other faculty and her grad students and asked him to tell everyone what he had done. Coan said that their "jaws dropped on the floor"; they all assumed I knew how to design case studies like some kind of prodigy, but I didn't have a clue. At first called "The Chris Study" it became the Lost in the mall technique - "Something important happened and my life was forever changed."

At University of Washington, while still an undergraduate, he began working with psychologist John Gottman who specialized in divorce prediction and marital stability. Coan said that they spent a lot of time listening to couples argue, and sometimes they goaded people into fights and then predicted which couples would divorce. Coan graduated with a PhD in clinical psychology, with an emphasis in neuroscience at the University of Arizona. He finished his postdoc at the University of Wisconsin.

== Lost in the mall technique ==
During Coan's first semester at the University of Washington, he was taking a class from memory expert Elizabeth Loftus who had been trying to figure out how to implant a memory in a subject that was traumatic yet would pass the Human Subjects Committee for human experimentation. Loftus, in discussion with clinical psychologist Denise Park and her young children, came up with the idea of implanting a false memory of being lost in a mall at the age of five. Still not sure if it would work, she talked it over with a colleague at a party whose eight-year-old daughter was in the room. The colleague asked his daughter if she remembered being lost in the mall when she was five. Within five minutes, the child had remembered the event and added details of the false event.

Back in the classroom, Loftus was still trying to work out the methodology of this being a formal test that would tell them if it was possible to implant a false memory to older individuals, and that the test would pass the strict standards for human testing. She assigned her cognitive psychology class the assignment to implant a memory of being lost in a mall to someone. Two students came up with a test, but Coan had come up with a methodology.

He had given his fourteen-year-old brother Chris four memories written down, three were real memories and one was the false one of being lost in the mall when he was five. Coan gave him details, that they searched for Chris and found him holding the hand of an old man who was wearing a flannel shirt. For five days, Coan asked Chris to keep a journal and every day, he had to write something for each of the four memories. If he didn't remember it, he was to write "I do not remember". Every day for the five days, Chris wrote a couple of sentences about the memory, and each day Chris remembered a bit more. Coan checked with their mom to make sure that this was not a real memory, and she assured him that it was not. At the end of four weeks Chris was interviewed again and told to rank each of the four memories - (one was false, three were real) - from 1 to 10. He ranked the false memory with an 8 and recounted many more details than he had remembered before. Then Coan told Chris that one of the four memories was a false one and asked Chris to pick it out. Chris selected one of the real memories. When told that the lost in the mall story was the false memory, Chris didn't believe him. Loftus writes in her book The Myth of Repressed Memory "The method used to create Chris's false memory seemed almost ideal." Coan became a chief research assistant for the project.

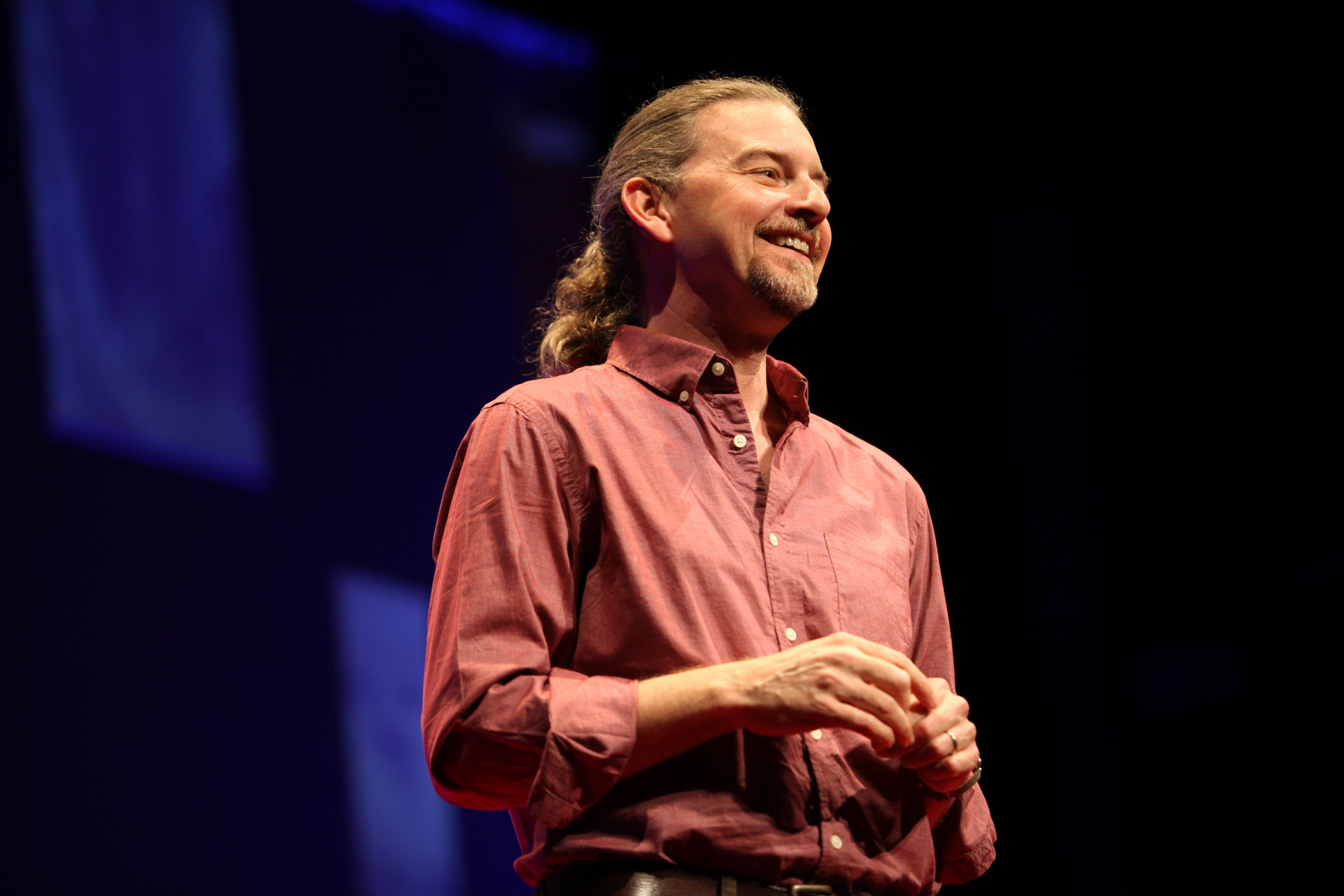
2013 Charlottesville TEDx talk

== Hand holding study ==
During Coan's years at the University of Arizona, he worked out his internship at the Tucson, Arizona Veterans Association (VA) where he met veterans from World War II. One man had wanted to share his story of liberating a concentration camp, relating to Coan that he had never told the story to anyone before. He cried and was in a state of stress until his wife sat beside him and held his hand. Only then could the man get though the story. John Gottman had been very interested in studying relationships between couples by studying the brain, mainly "how one partner could regulate the emotions of the other" and while working on his postdoc at the University of Wisconsin, Coan, working with Richard Davidson, designed a study using a brain scan with couples. One partner inside the scan would be threatened with a shock to the ankle, while holding the hand of their partner or the hand of a stranger. The hypothalamus "of the person threatened ... calmed down" compared to not holding anyone's hand or the hand of a stranger.

Upon further testing, Coan and his team learned that stress would reduce when holding someone's hand, but the quality of the relationship with the hand holder mattered. Women who tested with the highest scores on "marital quality tests" would have less stress when holding their husbands' hand. Friends, or people who were just dating, would lower stress in the MRI machine but not as much as when married. When people were married or perceived to be in a relationship "like a marriage", it made a difference. Coan thinks that when the relationship is predictable and dependable, then the brain will "outsource to - those we feel are most predicable and reliable for our emotion-regulation needs." Being in a marriage, the study seems to say, creates a condition in which the couple feel committed, which he calls "locked in" and not maintaining "emotional distance". In a 2013 Charlottesville TEDx talk, Coan said that he has learned that the brain sends the signal "I am here with you" when holding a partner's hand which changes to "we are here". The brain "outsources neuroprocessing to each other's brains."

In further studies, with a larger more "racially and socioeconomically diverse" group of people, they found that holding a stranger's hand had less of an impact on lowering stress. Coan realized that the brain's default is to be in a relationship and being without one is the problem. He called this social baseline theory. "'To the human brain, the world presents a series of problems to solve,” Coan said. “And it turns out being alone is a problem.'”

Initially Coan had intended to learn about the relationships between couples, but ended up learning about the brain "that changed (Coan's) understanding of evolution, of human cognitive evolution, the physiological mechanisms of sensing pain for generating anxiety." He stated that this research became a paradigm and the part of his career that he is "most proud of".

Coan has seen the power of hand holding, from when he witnessed seeing the WWII vet calm down and being able to tell his story once his wife held his hand, to Coan's personal life. He relates that he has held numerous hands of strangers on airplanes during turbulence, and every time he has extended his hand to help someone, the other person has never refused. He said holding hands "gets to the root and core of what it means to be a human being."

== Advising House Democrats ==
Rep. Jamie Raskin in January 2025 brought in two social psychologists to help Democrats serving on the House Judiciary Committee to learn how best to combat their Republican counterparts. The psychologists were Coan and Hal Movius. The two discussed communication styles specifically during the Trump era.

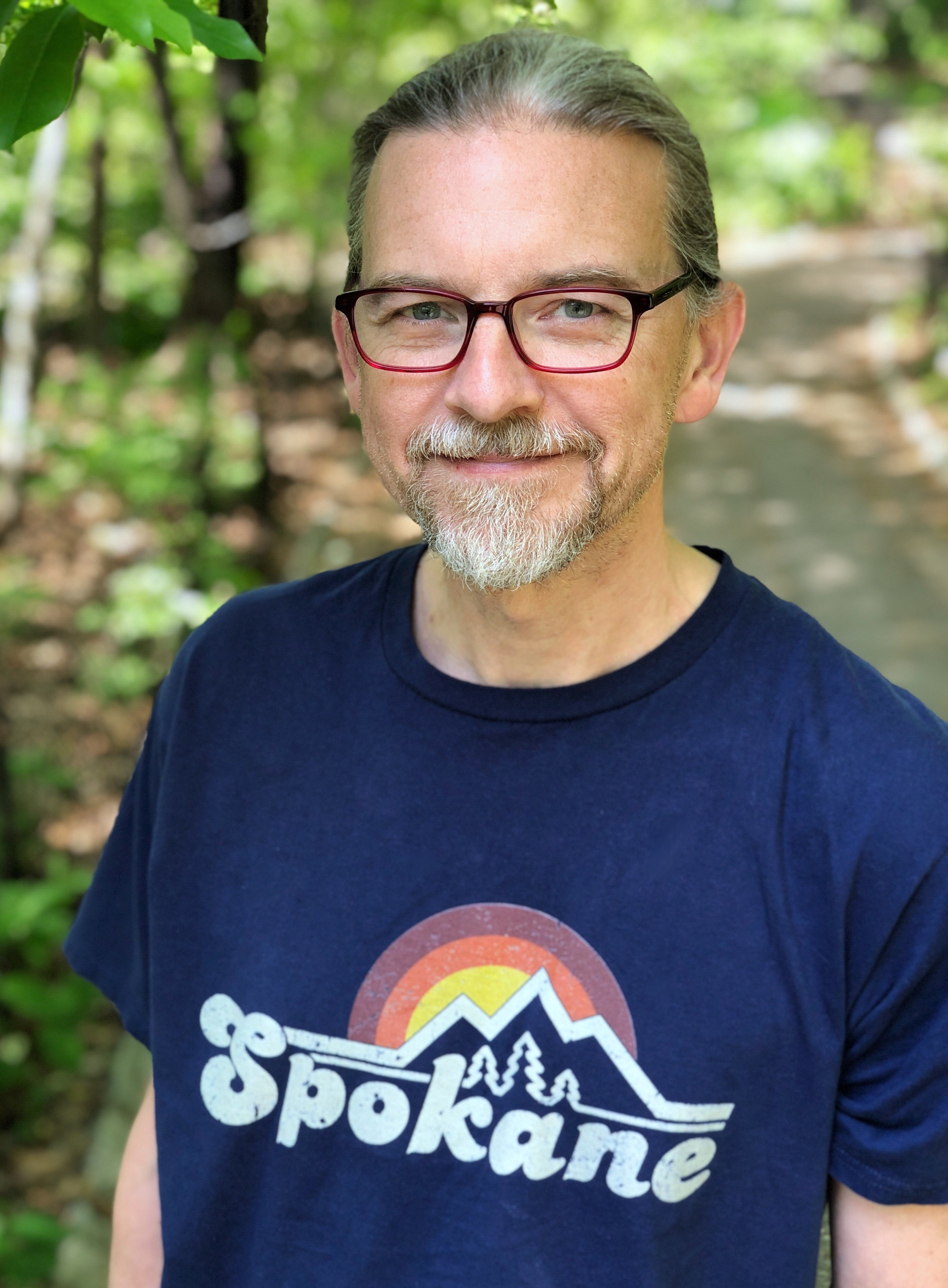
Jim Coan 2019

== Personal life ==
In 2018, Coan survived a widowmaker heart attack because when he was experiencing odd symptoms, he remembered a conversation he had had with psychologist Lisa Feldman Barrett, explaining that sometimes a hospital will run tests but send you home after telling you that you are experiencing anxiety. This happened to Coan; the hospital sent him home saying he was fine, but he went back to the hospital complaining he wasn't fine. As the cardiologist walked into the room, he went into cardiogenic shock.

Coan served as Principal of Brown College at Monroe Hill and during that tenure, he and his family lived in the home of President James Monroe.

A cartoonist since his childhood, Coan created "Our Social Baseline" which is published in the Virginia Quarterly Review. The comic focuses on climate change and how society needs people with diverse skills in order to survive and live happier lives. Coan appeared in nine episodes of Brain Games during the 2014 and 2015 seasons. He hosted and produced the podcast Circle of Willis from 2017 to 2023.

== Publications ==
- Handbook of Emotion Elicitation and Assessment (Series in Affective Science) (Oxford University Press: 2007). First edition, 2007. Editor, with John J. B. Allen
