= Julia Shaw =

Julia Shaw may refer to:

- Julia Shaw (cyclist) (born 1965), British cyclist
- Julia Shaw (psychologist) (born 1987), Canadian psychologist
