= Memory implantation =

Psychological technique

Memory implantation is a technique used in cognitive psychology to investigate human memory. In memory implantation studies researchers make people believe that they remember an event that actually never happened. The false memories that have been successfully implanted in people's memories include remembering being lost in a mall as a child, taking a hot air balloon ride, among other things which could be both good or bad.

Memory implantation techniques were developed in the 1990s as a way of providing evidence of how easy it is to distort people's memories of past events. Most of the studies on memory implantation were published in the context of the debate about repressed memories and the possible danger of digging for lost memories in therapy. The successful implantation of memories in people's minds has implications for therapy and legal settings.

== Successful memory implantation ==
=== Published studies ===
The first formal studies using memory implantation were published in the early 1990s, the most famous being "The Formation of False Memories" (commonly referred to as the "Lost in the Mall" study) by Loftus and Pickrell. The basic technique used in this study involved asking family members of a participant to provide narratives of events that happened when they were young and then add another event that definitely had not happened. The participants saw these four narratives and were told to try to remember as much as possible about each event. Across a number of studies using memory implantation, about 37% of people have come to remember parts of or entire events that never actually happened.

Other studies have expanded on this paradigm by introducing photos instead of narratives. Wade and colleagues found that 50% of people came to remember details of a hot air balloon ride that never happened, after seeing a manipulated photo depicting the event. Later it has been argued that photos by themselves do not produce more false memories than narratives, but that both methods have the power to successfully implant false memories. Real photos have also been found to increase the creation of false memories. In a study by Lindsay and colleagues people were shown a childhood photo from the same time period as the false event. Seeing the photo resulted in more false memories, even when the photos did not depict the actual event.

In a 1999 study with children Pezdek and Hodge found that it was easier to implant a memory of a plausible event (being lost in a mall) than an implausible one (receiving a rectal enema). Later follow up studies, however, show that the perceived plausibility of a false event can be changed, making the false event easier to implant. Taken together, these findings show that there are many factors that are important for the way people remember events.

Mazzoni also suggest a model for the development of false memories through suggestions which model includes 3 processes. The first process is to make people perceive the event as plausible, the second is to make people believe it is likely to have happened to them and the third step is to help people interpret thoughts and fantasies about the event as memories. Other factors influencing the likelihood of producing false memories include imagining the events and making a source-monitoring error, specifically reality monitoring.

=== Legal case ===
A real life example of memory implantation occurred during the criminal case against Paul Ingram. Ingram was accused by his daughters of recurring sexual abuse in their childhood. Ingram denied all allegations at first but after being interviewed by police and therapists he came to remember multiple instances of abuse.

Sociologist Richard Ofshe considered this confession a result of suggestive questioning and decided to test his theory. He told Ingram about a made-up scenario and said it was another accusation made by his children. Ofshe asked Ingram to try and remember as much as possible about this new event. Ingram could not recall anything straight away but after thinking about it for some time came up with a written confession where he described in detail what had happened. His children confirmed to Ofshe that the event had never actually happened; Ingram had created an entirely false memory of an event after suggestions from Ofshe. Ofshe considered this successful memory implantation evidence of Paul Ingram's suggestibility and in his opinion it questions the accuracy of Ingram's other confessions.

== Implications ==
The methods used in memory implantation studies are meant to mimic those used by some therapists to recover repressed memories of childhood events. The high rate of people "remembering" false events shows that memories cannot always be taken at face value. Being told to go home and look at old photos to jog your memory can help you remember real events, but paired with suggestions from a therapist it might also lead to false memories.

Memory implantation studies are also similar to recovered memory therapy in the way that they involve an authoritative figure claiming to know that the event actually happened and applying pressure on the participant/patient to remember.

Memory implantation techniques in general also illustrate how people can relatively easily come to remember things that actually never happened. This poses a big problem for criminal confessions resulting from suggestive questioning by police and others and also for the accuracy associated with eyewitness memory.

It has been argued that memory implantation studies are not applicable to real life memories of trauma such as childhood sexual abuse. As it is not ethical to try to implant false memories of sexual abuse researchers have tried to get around this by choosing other events that are seen as negative but not traumatic. Being lost in a shopping mall for example would be a negative experience for most children. Hyman and colleagues used memory implantation techniques with emotional events such as a specific birthday party (positive) and being hospitalized overnight (negative). They found that using emotional events did not change the rate of false memory creation significantly compared with other studies.

== Research with children ==
In 1998 Herrmann and Yoder published an article arguing for the cessation of memory implantation research with children. The criticisms referred to several studies investigating the suggestibility of children written by Ceci and colleagues. Herrmann and Yoder argue that the methods used can have negative implications for the children used such as lessen their respect for authority, be damaging for their concept of self (feel incompetent when it is pointed out that their memories are wrong) and cause stress.

This article created much debate and several commentaries to the article were published in the same June edition of the journal Applied Cognitive Psychology together with the original article. One of these was written by Ceci, Bruck and Loftus who disagree with the statements in Herrmann and Yoder's article. According to these authors there is no evidence that any children have been harmed in a memory implantation study and until such evidence exists there is no reason to stop using these techniques with children as long as it produces good research.

Ornstein and Gordon also replied to Herrmann and Yoder's article saying that although people conducting research with children have an ethical responsibility there is much to be gained from memory implantation research and the benefits outweigh the potential risk for children involved.

Another commentary written by Goodman, Quas and Redlich argues that there is reason to believe that children in general enjoy participating in false memory studies and that the benefits of these studies for research into eyewitness memory are many. They also refer to several cases where memory implantation studies have been cited in court and contributed to convictions being overturned.

Thompson and Jackson propose a modified version of the suggestions from Herrmann and Yoder and say that methods for being more ethically aware when doing research with children have to be developed. Also Westcott agrees with the general concerns about researchers having to take extra care when working with children.

In their responding article to all the commentaries Yoder and Herrmann again question whether memory implantation research with children is necessary and conclude that ethical guidelines should be put in place by Society for Applied Research in Memory and Cognition (SARMAC). Although all the researchers involved in these commentaries from this issue of Applied Cognitive Psychology put forward different arguments, the general consensus was that doing research with children calls for extra care and the benefits from the research must outweigh potential risk to the participating children.

== General criticism of the concept The Unconscious in therapies ==
Sociologist Richard Ofshe, an expert on false memories due to coercive interrogations as well as suggestive therapies, has testified as expert witness in many court cases dealing with spectacular legal scandals. Based on these experiences he published in 1999, together with a co-author, a fundamental criticism of the concept of the unconscious, because he considered it as the main underlying cause of the implanted memories he had been dealing with:

.... the idea of the dynamic unconscious proposes a powerful shadow mind that, unknown to its host, willfully influences the most minor thought and behavior. There is no scientific evidence of this sort of purposeful unconscious, nor is there evidence that psychotherapists have special methods for laying bare our out-of-awareness.

== See also ==
- Confabulation
- Imagination inflation
- Memory errors
- Misinformation effect
- Source-monitoring error
