= Memory conformity =

Phenomenon in memory

Memory conformity, also known as social contagion of memory, is the phenomenon where memories or information reported by others influences an individual and is incorporated into the individual's memory. Memory conformity is a memory error due to both social influences and cognitive mechanisms. Social contamination of false memory can be exemplified in prominent situations involving social interactions, such as eyewitness testimony. Research on memory conformity has revealed that such suggestibility and errors with source monitoring has far reaching consequences, with important legal and social implications. It is one of many social influences on memory.

== In and out of lab settings ==
=== Famous real-world examples ===
In 2003 immediately after the murder of former Swedish foreign minister Anna Lindh, witnesses were put in a room together so they could not leave the scene of the crime until they were interviewed. The witnesses discussed the scene with each other while in the room, contrary to what they were told to do. The specific descriptions the witnesses gave about the perpetrator upon leaving the room were influenced by each other, causing the police to collect false information during the initial search for the perpetrator. The perpetrator, Mijailo Mijailovic, was caught on camera and did not match the descriptions that the eyewitnesses gave. Conclusions have been made that the cause of this false search was rooted in witnesses discussion of their accounts with one another, which caused them to influence each other's memories of the event.

Another example occurred after the 1995 Oklahoma City bombing. Three employees were working at the location where Timothy McVeigh rented the truck he used in the bombing. Two of the witnesses originally thought that McVeigh was by himself, but the third believed that McVeigh came with an accomplice. After the three were left to discuss the event, the two witnesses came to the conclusion that there was indeed a second person who assisted McVeigh. The FBI believes that this "accomplice" never existed. The employee who claimed to have seen an accomplice most likely unintentionally influenced the other two employees, causing them to make later claims about an accomplice as well.

A possible example is an event from 1941 involving Rudolf Hess, Adolf Hitler's Chief of Staff, who had flown to Scotland to present the Duke of Hamilton with a peace proposal between Germany and Britain. Hess parachuted from his aircraft some miles off course, was apprehended and held, until two people who had met him years before, could be brought to identify him as Rudolf Hess. Prior to their meeting with Hess, the two individuals heard a radio report that Rudolf Hess had parachuted into Scotland and had been apprehended. The report colored their confirmation of Hess's identity when the man in question was shown to them. Despite the fact that about a hundred people in London could have positively identified Hess, the identification was made by these two men who anticipated it was Hess they were about to identify due to the report they had heard. Because no other people were ever called to identify Hess in subsequent years, there has been speculation that a double had impersonated Hess in this event.

=== Laboratory studies ===
Memory conformity and resulting misinformation can be either encountered socially (discourse between two or more people) or brought about by a non-social source. One study found that if an individual was given false information during a post-event discussion, the accuracy of the individual's memory was lowered, but if the individual was given accurate information during the discussion, then their recall was more accurate. Even when the subject's initial memories were very accurate, individuals who discussed their memory with someone who had witnessed a slightly different scene exhibited a decrease in accuracy due to conformity. Simply hearing another individual's report of an event can be enough to alter one's confidence in one's own recalled memory. Memory conformity has been shown to occur on tasks involving both free recall and recognition, with study participants being more likely to provide inaccurate details of photographs after having discussed them with another participant.

Memory conformity can typically be created in the research setting by using photos or videos which depict crime scenes. Typically, participants are led to believe that they had all viewed the same scene, but in reality the videos and photos were slightly different for each participant, or they were introduced to a confederate, who reported a different memory of the same event. After viewing, the participants are tested on their initial accuracy, and then allowed to discuss their memory with others to see how social interaction affects the accuracy of their memories. An early study found that despite having seen different scenes, 79% of pairs were able to come to an agreed-upon conclusion, meaning that nearly half of the individuals conformed to the other member of his or her pair. It is worth noting that, in this study, 98% of participants were initially accurate in their first recall of the scene.

== Underlying mechanisms ==
Three influences can contribute to memory conformity and social contagion errors: normative influences, information influences and source monitoring errors. Normative and informational influences on memory are both social influences that can lead to memory conformity.

=== Social influences ===
Normative influence, first suggested in the 1955 Asch conformity experiments, states that in social situations, people are more likely to make statements that they do not believe, in order to conform to social norms and to gain social acceptance. For example, research has shown that people who have social interactions after an event are more likely to change their thoughts about the event to something other than what they actually witnessed. In one experiment, 60% of participants reported findings that they could not possibly have witnessed.

A study analyzed which characteristics of dialogue, specifically in regard to response order from participants, had an effect on or predicted memory conformity. The study showed that the first member to report an element of their memory was resistant to influence, even when the memory was disputed by another person. In contrast, the person who was not the first to mention a detail were more likely to be influenced and subsequently report what the other person had seen, even if the memory report differed in detail to what they had themselves seen. Researchers suggested that normative conformity may have influenced the changes in memory reports because individuals wanted to appear to be in agreement with other around them in order to create a smooth interaction and increase their chances of being liked.

Information influence describes a kind of conformity in which people tend to report what someone else has stated previously because they depend on the other person to resolve uncertainty. People are more likely to conform, if they believe that their information source had more time to learn the materials, or had better visual acuity, or expressed high confidence in their judgment. One study found that those considered to be high-power individuals are more likely to influence those deemed to be low-power. High-power people are more likely to express themselves and lead discussions, while lower-power individuals will tend to follow and depend upon the more confident individual.

One study considered the effect on memory conformity when participants had to discuss information was encountered that omitted, added to, or contradicted originally encoded items. This study revealed that people are more likely to be influenced when encountering an additional item or detail in their memory, in comparison to omitted or contradictory manipulations. Researchers speculated that the uncertainty and debate that occurred in trials surrounding the confirmation of additional information supplied by another person convinced them that they had missed particular details, likely due to a lapse in attention, that ultimately led to altering their memory report. With the motivation participants had to be accurate in their reporting, informational influence was suspected to have played a role in the increased conformity that was found in this experiment.

=== Source monitoring ===
Source monitoring is the conscious effort one makes to determine the source from which a memory or piece of information came. These sources tend to be one's own experience with others and the world, or their own imagination and dreams. Specific and vivid details within each of these helps determine which of the possibilities is the most probable source. For one’s outer experience, these details usually involve the setting and events that occurred around that time. These are then contrasted with other events that have occurred in the past to judge what the source could have been. Personal, concrete experiences are often more vivid and have more detail than imagined experiences. Noticing the difference between details and vivid details can help to determine whether a piece of information came from experience or the imagination.

Source monitoring has a relationship with the frontal lobe of the brain, which is the region of the brain that is correlated with judgment and decision-making. The hippocampal region of the brain, involved with memory, is activated when retrieving information from external events. After having recalled a memory or piece of information with the help of the hippocampus, the brain uses its judgment abilities within the prefrontal cortex to determine whether it was received by a specific source or another.

Source monitoring errors is another mechanism underlying memory conformity. A source-monitoring error can lead to an incorrect internal attribution of a memory (the belief that a memory was made from first-hand experience), when in reality that information had an external source (someone else relayed the information). When a piece of information or a memory of an event has similar qualities to that of another, it is possible that the information is confused and stored incorrectly, because there are not enough differences to permit a strong enough distinction between the two. This can lead to false attributions when working in relation to sources. For example, when two men were speaking in a previous situation, it may be more difficult to recall which of them presented a specific piece of information when compared to one man and one woman speaking.

Suggestions and the opinions of others can highly affect whether an error in memory or source attribution occurs. Social interactions can increase source-monitoring errors, with law studies showing that participants attributed their memory to an incorrect source about 50% of the time. Real-life events have provided examples in which errors in source monitoring have occurred, especially in relation to criminal cases or terrorist events. To show this, a study was done with an Israeli plane crashing in Amsterdam. After being asked where each person had received the news of the event, many falsely reported their source of the information. Most claimed to have seen it on the television, although the event had not been filmed. It is likely that through descriptions of the event and stories, the brain created the event visually, causing the person to think it was seen on television.

== Important variables ==
=== Age ===
Researchers believe that old age and subsequent memory declines may cause individuals to rely more heavily on external aids, such as conversations with others to improve recall. This research would suggest that older adults are more susceptible to social influences on memory conformity. One study examining suggestibility found that older adults at an average age 76 experienced more memory distortion when introduced to misleading information than did young adults at an average age 20. Despite these findings, a study that investigated memory conformity effects between individuals who witnessed and then discussed a criminal event found no age-related differences in susceptibility to memory conformity effects in younger (18–30 years) as compared to older (60–80 years) participants. In this study, participants watched a unique video that contained items that were only seen by them and then assigned to a group that either took a recall test immediately (control) or a group that discussed the event before recalling details. 71%, a significant proportion of participants who discussed the event prior to recall, mistakenly recalled items that they had acquired during the discussion.

On the other end of the spectrum, children may also be more susceptible to memory conformity than young adults. One study found that when children (ages 3–5) were asked to freely recall an event with a co-witness who had seen a slightly different version of that same event, both children expressed social conformity in the presence of the co-witness and also exhibited memory distortion in an independent factual test afterwards. Other studies have gone further and found enhanced suggestibility and comparatively worse memory recall with younger children (ages 3–4) than older children (ages 10–12). Other studies have shown that adolescents are much more susceptible to peer influence and may therefore be more susceptible to the social influences of conformity than are young adults.

=== Confidence (or lack thereof) ===
An individual is more likely to conform their memories to another person's if the individual is uncertain about the accuracy of their own recall. Confidence plays an important role in uncertainty: people who are less confident are more likely to conform to the reports of others whom they suspect of having a better memory. This effect was demonstrated in a study that involved showing pairs of participants a set of photographs of a crime. Some photos contained images of an accomplice, while others did not. Immediately after seeing these photographs, participants were asked about the presence of an accomplice in the photographs, as well as their level of confidence in their reports. Initial reports were highly accurate, but after being placed in pairs where each person had seen a slightly different photograph, this pattern changed. Seventy-five percent of the pairs exhibited memory conformity, with one half of the dyad conforming to the other. In almost every case, the less confident person in the pair accepted the more confident person's memory as the correct one.

Internal confidence at the time of memory encoding also affects general social confidence levels. An individual's reliance on another person's memory is constantly changing as the initial encoder takes into account the conditions under which he/she first perceived the event, as well as the conditions (or believed conditions) under which another individual perceived that event. One study showed that levels of memory conformity between individuals varied based on confidence in the comparative quality of initial viewing conditions. Study participants who thought that they had had less time to view a scene than did another individual were much more likely to conform to that individual's report of an event, while participants who believed their initial viewing window to be longer were less likely to conform.

=== Group size ===
Studies have shown that there is a negative relationship between social influence and group size (meaning there is a stronger relationship with memory conformity in a smaller group). Researchers suggest that the influence of group size on conformity is determined by the absence or presence of dissenters, or those disagreeing with the larger group. The presence of dissenters works to decrease the overall group certainty and group unity, which decreases social conformity among group members, thus increasing individual internal reliance. Research suggests that the clarity of a participant's recollection of a memory plays a role in within-group recollection: as clarity and internal confidence increase, the pressure to conform to the group decreases. The same research goes on to show that false reports from confederates within a group influence participants more heavily when they are not confident in the accuracy of their memories than when they are internally confident in the accuracy of their memories.

=== Social anxiety ===
Researchers report social anxiety as having two significant components: fear of negative evaluation and social avoidance. It has been suggested that people with a fear of negative evaluation are more likely to be influenced by their peers, while those with a tendency for social avoidance are less likely to be influenced by their peers. The individuals concerned with negative evaluation are more likely to comply, as disagreeing with their peers is seen as having a higher cost than the cost of being wrong. Individuals with high levels of social avoidance, on the other hand, place less value on the information provided by others, and are less likely to pay attention to it, resulting in a lower level of conformity.

=== Relationships ===
Research has also shown that the strength of a relationship between individuals can affect their levels of conformity. Studies exploring levels of conformity between acquaintances and friends, and between strangers and romantic partners show that pairs of individuals with stronger relationships are more susceptible to memory conformity.

=== Source credibility ===
Source credibility involves the judgment of a source's believability based on various characteristics, such as the level of expertise and the trustworthiness of what has been presented. A piece of information may appear to be reliable based on how the source that is providing it is analyzed. This source can have its credibility confirmed through objective means. It can also be perceived to be credible based on various aspects the source, such as age, gender, status, and more. Studies have shown that when misinformation is presented by sources perceived to be less credible (e.g., older adults or children), it is less likely to be incorporated into memory. The decision of whether to trust information or not is often based on criteria such as an author's reputation, status, authority and the information's plausibility. Through opinions and media, some of these criteria tend to be manipulated and presented information often can be misunderstood.

== Resistance ==
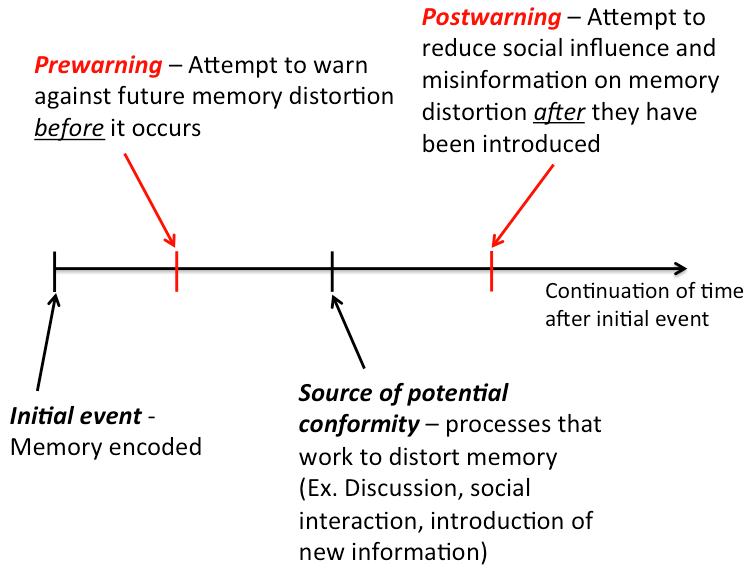
Timetable of prewarnings and postwarnings against memory conformity

Prewarnings are warnings given to individuals after an event but before social interaction (when misinformation can be introduced). They are meant to guard an individual against potential memory conformity. They can be warnings against the credibility of a witness or any other attempts to encourage the individual to trust internal sources and resist external conformity. For many lab experiments, prewarnings have consistently been effective in decreasing memory conformity. However, some prewarnings can work paradoxically to increase memory conformity by overly sensitizing the initial viewer, who then mistakenly incorporates incorrect post-event information into their initial memory.

Postwarnings are post-event attempts to reduce conformity. The misinformation effect can occur when the memory of an eyewitness is influenced by misinforming him or her after an event. Studies have found that social "postwarnings," like characterizing an individual as having low credibility after the misinformation has been introduced, can reduce the misinformation or memory conformity effect. The success of postwarnings depends on the motivation of the individual to be accurate and the individual's perceived threat of being unduly influenced. Even in the face of these postwarnings, many individuals still show memory conformity. Earlier research had shown that postwarnings can cause witnesses to overcorrect their memory exclusion and to neglect to report correct memories that were appropriately gained during the time or experience in question.

In a 2009 experiment, participants were first shown a crime video and then presented with non-witnessed details (details not in the original video) either through a discussion group, by reading a report, or by watching another version of the video. All three groups similarly reported non-witnessed details after the first rendition of the experiment, but when the experiment was later repeated and participants were warned against incorporating details from their post-video groups, all three groups showed a significant decrease in report of non-witnessed details. This postwarning worked to encourage more sensitive source monitoring, which caused a decrease in conformity.

Researchers have investigated how the timing of postwarnings influenced conformity. Some researchers have found postwarnings to be ineffective at reducing memory conformity when they warned their subjects one week after they were misinformed. A 2002 study, which presented the warning soon after participants were exposed to the false information found postwarnings to have a significant effect on conformity. A more recent study found postwarnings were ineffective at reducing memory conformity, and that warnings at different times after exposure to misinformation did not matter. However, experimenters did not test all of their participants in one session, which means the warnings were given shortly after the initial event was encoded and shortly after the misinformation was presented.

=== Additional study opportunities ===
Additional opportunities to study after collaboration and receiving misinformation from a partner may protect against misinformation.

== Legal implications ==
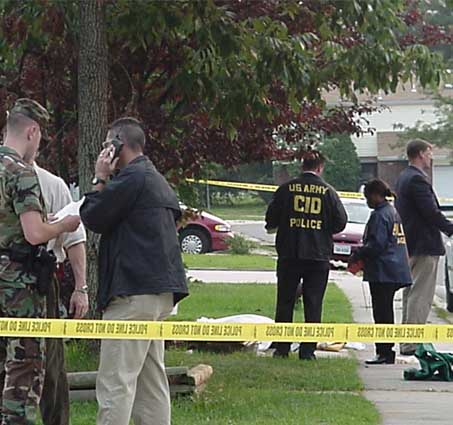
Leading questions can alter eyewitness memory.

The most common cause of the wrongful conviction of innocent people is false testimony due to eyewitness errors. Eyewitnesses can encounter post-event information after witnessing a crime. Post-event information comes in three basic types, the first of which is due to the impact that a biased or leading question can have on altering an eyewitness's memory of the event. The second type occurs when the eyewitness is retold the events that they witnessed. False information included within the retelling is often incorporated into the eyewitness's memories, thus altering their perception of the events that occurred. The third type of post-event information originates from conversations with others. Recent research has shown that there is a critical period for eyewitnesses that occurs before they get to report their side of the story. During this time, they are most susceptible to outside influences contaminating their version of the events.

The effects of witness discussion on memory are even more enhanced when the witnesses know each other well. People are more likely to believe information, regardless of whether it is true or false, when it comes from someone they know—say, a friend or significant other. Such a person could be viewed with more credibility than a stranger for a variety of reasons, including a greater trust and familiarity in the relationship. This kind of pattern falls under a larger trend that the perceived credibility of the person providing external information has significant influence over memory conformity.

The way in which witnesses retrieve memory is also an important factor in the likelihood of an individual expressing memory conformity. Studies have shown that when participants were asked to discuss their memories of a violent crime video in terms of their emotions, they had higher levels of subjectivity and major errors in free recall.

One of the seven sins of memory is suggestibility. Interaction with other people changes the pool of information that one has about an event and can sway one's thoughts on how the event actually unfolded. This suggestibility seems to be the most common way in which post-event information distortion occurs in a legal setting because often, witnesses cannot be prevented from talking to one another. That said, there are multiple factors that affect the potential for suggestibility in a witness. More accurate memories are also less susceptible to memory conformity than less accurate ones. This finding is important for legal situations because it may be logically deduced that a witness with a more accurate memory of the event in question will be less likely to change his or her story after discussing it with other witnesses, and someone with a less accurate recollection could be more prone to conform.

=== Everyday implications ===
False autobiographical memories can also occur over time. In a recent study, 43% of subjects remembered a childhood event that they never actually experienced. These naturally occurring autobiographical memories can span a large temporal range, from recent events to childhood memories. These memories also contain weak perceptual detail, which makes them similar to real childhood memories and thus more believable to the person.

First-born children are also more likely than their later-born siblings to dominate a discussion and encounter conformity errors. In one study, later-born children were more influenced if they had reason to believe that the information given to them was more valid than the information they themselves possessed. First-born children were relatively unaffected by informational value and were more influenced by their motivation to either go along with or to resist the expectations of the majority.

Discussion of memory conformity is also particularly relevant in today's age of mass advertisement. Research suggests that our predisposition to trust the judgment of a group can be affected by political campaigns and advertising, and even work to alter personal beliefs. These brain imaging studies go on to show that conformity can be seen at the neurological level when an individual changes his or her personal beliefs due to social influence (called private conformity). The same work has shown that individuals can outwardly conform by seeming to support a group's beliefs or decisions (public conformity), but without the private conformity and the subsequent neurological changes.

=== Potential benefits ===
Analyses of memory conformity typically focus entirely on its negative consequences, such as witness memory distortion; however, there are some benefits to memory conformity. In fact, some psychologists posit that memory conformity more often results in positive outcomes than negative ones. When an individual is not confident in the information he or she alone possesses (high subjective uncertainty), reverting to external sources for help usually has no greater potential for an inaccurate memory report than sticking with the original, shaky memory. When the stakes are not as high as something like a criminal trial, other people are a readily available and highly useful means for helping to recall memories.

== See also ==
- Cognitive dissonance – Mental phenomenon of holding contradictory beliefs
- Conformity – Matching opinions and behaviors to group norms
- False memory syndrome – Proposed condition of false or biased recollections
- Hindsight bias – Type of confirmation bias
- Interference theory – Theory regarding human memory
- Lost in the mall technique – Memory implantation technique
- Memory errors – Error caused by a memory fault
- Mandela effect – False memories shared by many people
- Retroactive continuity – Literary device in fictional storytelling
