= False memory syndrome =

Proposed condition of false or biased recollections

In psychology, false memory syndrome (FMS) was a proposed "pattern of beliefs and behaviors" in which a person's identity and relationships are affected by false memories of psychological trauma, recollections which are strongly believed by the individual, but contested by the accused. FMS is not listed as a psychiatric illness in any medical manuals including the ICD-11, or the DSM-5.

False memory syndrome was proposed to be the result of recovered memory therapy, a scientifically discredited form of therapy intended to recover memories. Originally conceptualized by the False Memory Syndrome Foundation, the organization sought to understand what they understood as a general pattern of behaviors that followed after a patient underwent recovered memory therapy and to come up with a term to explain the pattern. The most influential figure in the genesis of the theory is psychologist Elizabeth Loftus.

The principle that individuals can hold false memories and the role that outside influence can play in their formation is widely accepted by scientists, but there is debate over whether this effect can lead to the kinds of detailed memories of repeated sexual abuse and significant personality changes (i.e. cutting off family members) typical of cases that FMS has historically been applied to.

== Definition ==
Memory researcher Julia Shaw notes that the "syndrome" does not refer to the normal, common, experience of having false memories or exhibiting memory errors or biases. False memory syndrome was a proposed "pattern of beliefs and behaviors" in which a person's identity and interpersonal relationships center on a memory of a traumatic experience that the accused claims never happened but which the purported victim strongly believes occurred.

Not intended to be diagnostic, the colloquial "syndrome" referred to a set of behaviors that settled into a pattern:

1. The belief that a mental health problem is a reaction to a past traumatic event that was repressed.
2. The development of pseudomemories
3. A centering of identity surrounding the memories
4. The development of an extreme dependence on psychotherapy and a therapist
5. Estrangement from family and friends

The FMS concept is controversial, and neither the Diagnostic and Statistical Manual of Mental Disorders nor the International Classification of Diseases include it. FMSF member Paul R. McHugh, among other supporters of the false memory syndrome construct, has suggested that the term was not adopted into the fourth version of the manual because the pertinent committee was, according to McHugh, being headed by believers in recovered memory. Those involved in the process of editing and publishing DSM-IV have rejected this accusation and characterized McHugh's claim as conspiratorial, noting that the most recent edition of the International Classification of Diseases similarly chose not to include false memory syndrome while including dissociative amnesia.

== Recovered memory therapy ==
Recovered memory therapy is a catch all phrase to describe the scientifically discredited therapeutic processes and methods that can create false memories. These non-exhaustive methods include hypnosis, sedative guided interviews, journal writing for the purpose of recovering memories (often in the form of automatic writing), age regression and interpretation of "body memories" especially where the therapist believes repressed memories of traumatic events are the cause of their client's problems. The term is not listed in DSM-5 or used by any mainstream formal psychotherapy modality, which has led to accusations that the term is little more than a pejorative.

== Evidence for false memories ==
Human memory is created and highly suggestible, and can create a wide variety of innocuous, embarrassing, and frightening memories through different techniques—including guided imagery, hypnosis, and suggestion by others. Though not all individuals exposed to these techniques develop memories, experiments suggest a significant number of people do, and will actively defend the existence of the events, even if told they were false and deliberately implanted. Questions about the possibility of false memories created an explosion of interest in suggestibility of human memory and resulted in an enormous increase in the knowledge about how memories are encoded, stored and recalled, producing pioneering experiments such as the lost in the mall technique. In Roediger and McDermott's (1995) experiment, subjects were presented with a list of related items (such as candy, sugar, honey) to study. When asked to recall the list, participants were just as, if not more, likely to recall semantically related words (such as sweet) than items that were actually studied, thus creating false memories. This experiment, though widely replicated, remains controversial due to debate considering that people may store semantically related items from a word list conceptually rather than as language, which could account for errors in recollection of words without the creation of false memories. Susan Clancy discovered that people claiming to have been victims of alien abductions are more likely to recall semantically related words than a control group in such an experiment.

The lost in the mall technique is a research method designed to implant a false memory of being lost in a shopping mall as a child to test whether discussing a false event could produce a "memory" of an event that did not happen. In her initial study, Elizabeth Loftus found that 25% of subjects came to develop a "memory" for the event which had never actually taken place. Extensions and variations of the lost in the mall technique found that an average of one third of experimental subjects could become convinced that they experienced things in childhood that had never really occurred, even traumatic or impossible events.

=== Sexual abuse cases ===
The question of the accuracy and dependability of a repressed memory that someone has later recalled has contributed to some investigations and court cases, including cases of alleged sexual abuse or child sexual abuse (CSA). The research of Elizabeth Loftus has been used to counter claims of recovered memory in court and it has resulted in stricter requirements for the use of recovered memories being used in trials, as well as a greater requirement for corroborating evidence. In addition, some U.S. states no longer allow prosecution based on recovered memory testimony. Insurance companies have become reluctant to insure therapists against malpractice suits relating to recovered memories.

Supporters of recovered memories argue that there is overwhelming evidence that the mind is capable of repressing traumatic memories of child sexual abuse. Whitfield states that the "false memory" defense is "seemingly sophisticated, but mostly contrived and often erroneous." He states that this defense has been created by "accused, convicted and self-confessed child molesters and their advocates" to try to "negate their abusive, criminal behavior." Brown states that when pro-false memory expert witnesses and attorneys state there is no causal connection between CSA and adult psychopathology, that CSA doesn't cause specific trauma-related problems like borderline and dissociative identity disorder, that other variables than CSA can explain the variance of adult psychopathology and that the long-term effects of CSA are non-specific and general, that this testimony is inaccurate and has the potential of misleading juries.

=== Malpractice cases ===
During the late 1990s, there were multiple lawsuits in the United States in which psychiatrists and psychologists were successfully sued, or settled out of court, on the charge of propagating iatrogenic memories of childhood sexual abuse, incest, and satanic ritual abuse.

Some of these suits were brought by individuals who later declared that their recovered memories of incest or satanic ritual abuse had been false. The False Memory Syndrome Foundation uses the term retractors to describe these individuals, and has shared their stories publicly. There is debate regarding the total number of retractions as compared to the total number of allegations, and the reasons for retractions.

==== Injuries resulting from malpractice ====
Sexual abuse of children and adolescents can lead to severe negative consequences. Child sexual abuse is a risk factor for many classes of psychiatric disorders, including anxiety disorders, affective disorders, dissociative disorders and personality disorders. Failure to meet recognized medical standards by psychiatrists causes injury to patients and the accused. Ramona v. Isabella was a prominent case of malpractice in 1994. A California jury awarded $500,000 to Gary Ramona, whose daughter Holly had falsely accused him of sexual abuse as a child, based on false memories retrieved by therapists during treatment for bulimia. Los Angeles Superior Court Judge Burton Bach dismissed Holly Ramona's civil case against her father, holding that the outcome of her father's malpractice suit had resolved the issue of whether any abuse took place. The Washington Post titled the article Sex Abuse Suit Dismissed in False-Memory Case on December 14, 1994. There were numerous cases brought to trial in the 1990s. Most included combinations of the misuse of hypnosis, guided imagery, sodium amytal, and anti-depressants.

The term "false memory syndrome" describes the phenomenon in which a mental therapy patient "remembers" an event such as childhood sexual abuse, that never occurred. The link between certain therapy practices and the development of psychological disorders such as dissociative identity disorder comes from malpractice suits and state licensure actions against therapists. These cases demonstrate the ease with which an individual can be led to exhibit dissociative symptoms, especially when hypnosis, sodium amytal, strong medications, or readings involving traumatic imagery magnify the effect of therapist suggestions or expectations. These cases also show that once the symptoms become established, the standard treatment modality often leads to a deterioration of the mental and emotional well-being of the patient.

== In popular culture ==
Television shows and movies have been made about the phenomenon, such as the USA Network series The Sinner, which touches on the idea of recovering forgotten memories. The show focuses on a woman who kills a seemingly random man on the beach one day for playing a song that triggered a traumatic event from her past, which she has temporarily forgotten. Throughout the first season detectives try to trigger her memory and find a motive for her actions.

== See also ==
- Alien abduction – Subjective experience of victimization by extraterrestrials
- False allegation of child sexual abuse
- McMartin preschool trial – 1980s day care sexual abuse case
- Memory bias
- Memory conformity – Phenomenon in memory
- Memory distrust syndrome – Psychological condition
- Memory implantation – Psychological technique
