= Imagination inflation =

Type of memory distortion

Imagination inflation is a type of memory distortion that occurs when imagining an event that never happened increases confidence in the memory of the event.

Several factors have been demonstrated to increase the imagination inflation effect. Imagining a false event increases familiarity, which may cause people to mistake this as evidence that they have experienced the event. Imagination inflation could also be the result of source confusion or source monitoring errors. When imagining a false event, people generate information about the event that is often stored in their memory. Later, they might remember the content of the memory but not its source and mistakenly attribute the recalled information to a real experience.

This effect is relevant to the study of memory and cognition, particularly false memory. Imagination inflation often occurs during attempts to retrieve repressed memories (i.e. via recovered memory therapy) and may lead to the development of false or distorted memories. In criminal justice, imagination inflation is tied to false confessions because police interrogation practices involving suspects to imagine committing or planning the crime in question.

== Research ==
=== Early research ===
In 1996, Elizabeth Loftus, Maryanne Garry, Charles Manning, and Steven Sherman, conducted the original imagination inflation study. The study examined the effect of imagining a childhood event on childhood memories. It was the first study to examine the effects of imagining false events on memory in the absence of other factors present in previous studies, such as social pressure. In the study, the act of imagining unexperienced childhood events, such as being rescued by a lifeguard or breaking a window with one's hand, increased confidence that the events had occurred. After people imagined events with low initial confidence ratings (i.e. ones which they originally said they had not experienced) they became more confident that the events took place compared with unimagined ones.

Due to the unreliability of memory, it is not possible to be certain whether or not someone has had a given experience based solely self-reports. This leaves open the possibility that imagination does not actually have any effect on beliefs about false past events, but instead helps people retrieve actual memories of true experiences. In 1998, Lyn Goff and Henry Roediger used a different method to study imagination inflation effect for events that could be confirmed. It also looked at the effect of imagination on recognition reports rather than confidence ratings. Participants performed certain actions (such as breaking a toothpick) but not others, then imagined doing other actions in the overall set, and finally were given a list of old actions encountered in the first two parts of the study and brand new actions. Participants were more likely to mistakenly say that they had performed imagined actions compared to unimagined actions.

=== Further research ===
Later studies have used similar methods with a pre-test rating of a series of events, an intervening cognitive task using the events, and a post-test confidence rating. These have shown that a similar imagination inflation effect occurs when instead of imagining, people simply explain how events could have happened or paraphrase them. These findings suggest that vivid imagining is not always necessary for "imagination inflation" to occur; explanation or paraphrasing may function to make the false event seem more fluent and thus more familiar without producing a detailed image of it.

Other research has investigated what types of events can show an imagination inflation effect, often using a method similar to Goff and Roediger's, in which participants perform some actions but not others, then imagine some of them, and later mistakenly believe they have performed imagined actions but not control unimagined ones. One comparison found a similar imagination inflation effect for actions identical to those in Goff and Roediger's study (i.e. "break the toothpick") and altered, bizarre versions of such actions (i.e. "kiss the magnifying glass"). Another found an effect when people imagined a highly unusual action such as kissing a vending machine or lying on a couch and talking to Sigmund Freud. Some people have developed false beliefs of having performed bizarre actions or experienced more ordinary events even after imagining somebody else, rather than themselves, performing them.

== Causes ==
The cause of the imagination inflation effect is debated. There is evidence that source-monitoring framework, the familiarity misattribution theory, and the effects of sensory elaboration contribute to the formation of false memories through imagination inflation. It has been theorized that these effects, and other unknown effects, all contribute to the imagination inflation effect.

=== Source-monitoring framework ===
The source-monitoring framework, developed by Thomas et al., states that memories are not specified as real or imagined. Thus, under this framework, after imaging an event, it is difficult to distinguish whether the memory is real or not.

=== Familiarity misattribution theory ===
Under the familiarity misattribution theory, the imagination inflation effect is likely to occur because imagining an event increases familiarity with that event. This familiarity is then misattributed and interpreted as evidence that the event actually occurred.

=== Sensory elaboration ===
Thomas et al. argue that perceptual components of imagining events confuse actual lived memories because of elaboration. When participants included sensory details while recalling imagined events, participants were more likely to falsely remember the imagined events. Participants were thought to confuse imagined events with actual events because of the specific and elaborate nature of their imagination. The results of the study argue that elaboration (in the form of vivid sensory details) leads to increased formation of false memories.

== Implications ==
=== False confessions ===
Imagination inflation has implications for the criminal justice system, in particular interrogation and interviewing procedures. Interrogators who ask suspects to repeatedly imagine committing a crime risk making their suspects more confident that they are the perpetrators, ultimately producing false confessions from innocent suspects. In one case in the United States in the 1990s, after an intense police interrogation, a man who initially denied accusations of raping his daughters admitted to crimes that were even denied by his accusers, including abusing his children and leading a satanic cult which sacrificed babies. The psychologist Richard Ofshe argued that the confessions were false memories created by repeated suggestion.

In another interrogation technique, interrogators ask suspects to explain how a crime might have been committed or how they themselves could have done it. This practice has been suggested as another cause of self-generated false confessions because it forces an innocent suspect to create a believable narrative of their own guilt. This is supported by research in which people explained how a false childhood event could have occurred, and, after, became more confident that it had really happened.

== Criticisms ==
=== Regression to the mean ===
A 2001 critique argued that the original findings of the 1996 imagination inflation study did not in fact reflect changed beliefs about the past via imagination, but were instead a product of regression to the mean. That is, events with confidence ratings at the extreme (low or high) ends of the scale at the first time of measurement happened to have such scores due only to observational error, so they became more moderate at post-test. The authors of the 1996 paper disagreed with this interpretation, pointing out several issues that they found in Pezdek's reasoning. In particular, they agreed that regression to the mean was present in their own data and contributed to the overall changes in confidence at the second test. But this could not explain the finding that imagining events that were low in confidence led to a greater increase in ratings than for unimagined low-confidence events, as regression to the mean should affect all events equally.
