= Allomnesia =

Deformation of actual memories

Allomnesia or memory illusion is a memory disorder which involves distorted memories of a past situation. It is generally a physiological phenomenon, which is occasionally found in most subjects. Pathologically, it can occur frequently in subjects with mood disorders such as depression or mania and in those with schizophrenia, paranoia or other types of delirium. Treatment is done by identifying the cause of the disease and treating the same.
