= Lee Sechrest =

American psychologist

- Born: Lee Burton Sechrest; January 1, 1929; Kansas City, Missouri
- Died: October 10, 2015 (aged 86); Tucson, Arizona
- Education: Ohio State University
- Known for: Research methodology
- Scientific career
- Fields: Psychology
- Workplaces: Northwestern University; Florida State University; University of Michigan; University of Arizona
- Thesis: Patients' interpretations of their psychotherapists (1956)
- Doctoral advisor: George Kelly

Lee Burton Sechrest (January 1, 1929 – October 10, 2015) was an American psychologist and research methodologist.

== Early life and education ==
Sechrest was born on January 1, 1929, in Kansas City, Missouri. In 1937, his family moved to Augusta, Kansas, and they moved again to Osawatomie in 1943. He graduated from Osawatomie High School in 1946. He began taking classes at Pittsburg State University in 1948, and transferred from there to Ohio State University in 1949. He earned his B.A. from Ohio State in 1952 and his Ph.D. from there in 1956, both in psychology.

== Academic career ==
Sechrest joined the faculty of Pennsylvania State University (Penn State) in 1956 as an assistant professor of psychology. He left Penn State in 1958 to become an assistant professor at Northwestern University, where he was promoted to associate professor in 1964 and to full professor in 1967. In 1973, he became a professor of psychology at Florida State University, and in 1980, he was named director of the Center for Research on the Utilization of Scientific Knowledge in the Institute for Social Research at the University of Michigan. In 1984, he joined the University of Arizona as professor and chair of the Department of Psychology, serving as department chair until 1989. He served as president of the Society of Clinical Psychology (Division 12 of the American Psychological Association) in 1985. He continued to serve as an active faculty member at the University of Arizona until 2002, whereupon he became an emeritus professor there.

== Honors and awards ==
Sechrest received awards from Divisions 5 (Evaluation, Measurement and Statistics) and 18 (Psychologists in Public Service) of the American Psychological Association. In April 2003, a festschrift was held in his honor at the University of Arizona, where he received the lifetime achievement award from the American Psychological Society.
