= Source-monitoring error =

Type of memory error

A source-monitoring error is a type of memory error where the source of a memory is incorrectly attributed to some specific recollected experience. For example, individuals may learn about a current event from a friend, but later report having learned about it on the local news, thus reflecting an incorrect source attribution. This error occurs when normal perceptual and reflective processes are disrupted, either by limited encoding of source information or by disruption to the judgment processes used in source-monitoring. Depression, high stress levels and damage to relevant brain areas are examples of factors that can cause such disruption and hence source-monitoring errors.

== Introduction ==
One of the key ideas behind source-monitoring is that rather than receiving an actual label for a memory during processing, a person's memory records are activated and evaluated through decision processes; through these processes, a memory is attributed to a source. Source-monitoring relies heavily on the individual's activated memory records; if anything prevents encoding the contextual details of an event while it happens, relevant information will not be fully retrieved and errors will occur. If the attributes of memory representations are highly differentiated, then fewer errors are expected to occur and vice versa. Two cognitive judgment processes exist regarding source-monitoring; these are commonly called heuristic and systematic judgement processes.

=== Heuristic judgements ===
Heuristic judgements are made quickly without the conscious awareness of the individual, making use of perceptual, contextual, and other event-related information. These occur more frequently because they are efficient and occur automatically without the individual putting forth conscious effort. A decision is made about a source when relevant information is of a certain significance and the memory occurring at a certain time or place makes sense logically; errors then occur based on the amount of information stored at encoding or the way that an individual's brain makes decisions based on prior experiences. Within the source-monitoring framework, "heuristic" is a type of decision process; this term is directly related to the psychological heuristics.

=== Systematic judgements ===
Systematic judgements are decision processes whose procedures are accessed consciously by the individual; the same types of information used in heuristic judgements are also used in systematic judgements. In this process, all memory-relevant information is retrieved from memory and assessed deliberately to determine whether a memory is likely to have come from a specific source. Systematic judgements occur less frequently in source judgements because they are slow and require a lot of conscious effort. Errors occur due to a misassignment of the weight of certain aspects of memories: assigning high importance to visual information would mean that having poor details of this aspect would be cause for an assumption that the event did not happen or was imagined. Errors will occur if an individual's subjective logic leads them to perceive an event as unlikely to occur or belong to a specific source, even if the truth is otherwise. Simple memory decay can be a source for errors in both judgements, keeping an individual from accessing relevant memory information, leading to source-monitoring errors.

== Types ==
There are three major types of source-monitoring: external source-monitoring, internal source-monitoring, and reality monitoring, all of which are susceptible to errors and make use of the two judgment processes.

=== External source-monitoring ===
This type of source-monitoring focuses on discriminating between externally retrieved sources, such as events happening in the world surrounding the individual. An example of this is determining which one of an individual's friends said something rude.

=== Internal source-monitoring ===
This type of source-monitoring focuses on discriminating between internally derived sources, such as the individual's memories. An example of this is differentiating between memories of thought ideas and spoken ideas.

=== Reality monitoring ===
This type, also known as internal-external reality monitoring, is derived from the previous two types and focuses on discriminating between internally and externally retrieved sources. An example of this is discriminating a plane crashing into a building portrayed in real life and in a newspaper. This internal-external distinction also applies to the ability to separate events from our past and imagined future events in our memory. People make fewer reality-monitoring errors when searching memory for future events compared with past events, possibly because the features characterizing future events (e.g., cognitive operations) are used more effectively during reality monitoring than features characterizing past events (e.g., perceptual details). These reality-monitoring errors can be reduced in younger adults for events that have more perceptual details and more cognitive operations. In older adults, the more detailed events do not help reduce these autobiographical reality-monitoring errors, possibly due to limits in processing resources.

== Relationship to brain ==
Observations have been made that indicate a relationship between the prefrontal cortex of the brain and source-monitoring errors. These errors can be seen in everyone, but often are increased in amnesic patients, older adults, and in patients who have organic brain disease with frontal lobe damage. There are many processes that occur in the frontal regions that are important for source-monitoring; these include circuits linked with the hippocampus that encourage feature binding and structures that play a role in strategic retrieval. The left hemisphere of the prefrontal cortex is involved in systematic judgments and the right hemisphere of the prefrontal cortex is involved in heuristic judgments. Processes which promote the binding or clustering of features, both physically and cognitively during encoding and retrieval, are important to source memory.

== Development and aging ==
Many experiments have been done in an attempt to find whether source-monitoring errors are more prevalent in a particular age group; they are most prevalent in elderly individuals and young children. It has been proposed that source-monitoring errors are common in young children because they have difficulties with differentiating real and imaginary ideas, confirming that young children have difficulties in aspects of reality monitoring. With regards to eyewitness testimony, elderly individuals are more likely to make errors in identifying the source of a memory, making them more susceptible to misleading information. Reality monitoring may often lead to source-monitoring errors because a memory may not be typical of its original class. For example, if an internal memory contains a large amount of sensory information, it may be incorrectly recalled as externally retrieved. However, older adults do not always exhibit source-monitoring errors, such as when encoded material are visually distinctive as is the case with pictures compared to words. Older adults appear to be unable to expend additional neural resources in the prefrontal cortex in conditions associated with greater demands, thus increasing source-monitoring errors for non-distinctive materials. One exception is older adults with higher cognitive reserve, who may be able to maintain processing resources for longer periods of time and reduce source-monitoring errors compared with older adults with lower cognitive reserve.

== Related phenomena ==
=== Old-new recognition ===
Old-new recognition is a measurement method used to assess recognition memory. The process is that a participant indicates if an item is new by responding "no" and vice versa. Errors can occur in this form of recognition in a similar fashion to how they occur in source-monitoring; errors occur more frequently when objects are very similar, when circumstances of the situation make information retrieval difficult (like distractions or stress), or when the judgment processes are impaired in some way. The heuristic and systematic judgment process in particular are suspected to be the similar to those used in source-monitoring, with higher levels of differentiation needed for source-monitoring processes than for recognition.

=== Remember-know ===
Remember versus know judgements are processes for evaluating memory awareness, where an individual must distinguish between remembering or knowing. When a memory is remembered, the experience can be relived mentally, and related details are brought to mind without difficulty. When a memory is known, the experience cannot be relived but individuals feel a sense of familiarity, often leading to confident (mis)attribution to a likely source. Both judgements are subject to source-monitoring errors, and it has been demonstrated that under some circumstances, such as in the DRM paradigm, remember judgements are more likely to occur.

=== DRM paradigm ===
The Deese–Roediger–McDermott paradigm, or DRM paradigm, is a cognitive psychological procedure to study false memory in humans, wherein a list of related words (e.g. bed, rest, awake, tired, dream, wake, snooze, blanket, doze, slumber, snore, nap, peace, yawn, drowsy) is presented to a participant. The individual is then asked to free recall the words from the list, and results often find that subjects falsely remember related words (i.e. sleep) just as often as they recall presented words. This represents a source-monitoring error because participants who recall the non-presented word, they are demonstrating an inability to distinguish if the source of the word is their own thoughts or the list of presented words.

=== False fame ===
In the false fame experiment, participants are presented with a list of non-famous names. Later, they are presented with the same names as before, with new non-famous and famous people. The participants then have to determine which names are famous, and the typical finding is that the old non-famous names are often misidentified as famous. This is a source-monitoring error because they have attributed the name's actual origin to a source other than the list where they originally read it.

There have been studies linking individuals who believe in false, abnormal life events (like memories from past lives) to an increased proneness to source-monitoring errors. Specifically, these individuals demonstrate more errors in the false fame task than people who do not have such fabricated memories of abnormal life events. In the case of past-life memories, the sources of certain memories are incorrectly attributed to a previous life. Individuals may falsely believe in the existence of certain people, movies, books, dreams, or imaginary scenarios that never truly happened, making them more likely to misidentify non-famous names as 'famous,' likely as a result of misbelieving the name refers to a famous person from their past life.

=== Cryptomnesia ===
Cryptomnesia is unintentional plagiarism occurring when a person produces something believing that it was self-generated, when it was actually generated earlier, either internally or by an external source. This may occur because of distractions during initial exposure to information. Even if the information is acquired unconsciously, the area of the brain related to that information will be highly activated for a short amount of time. This may lead a person to generate ideas that were actually acquired from an outside source or personally generated earlier. Heuristic judgement processes are typically used for source judgements; since there was interference during initial exposure, the heuristic processes will likely judge the source of the information to be internally generated.

== Related disorders ==
Source-monitoring errors can occur in both healthy and non-healthy individuals alike. They have been observed in neurological and psychiatric populations such as amnesics, individuals who have undergone a cingulotomy, obsessive compulsive individuals and alcoholics.

=== Schizophrenia ===
Source-monitoring errors have been found to be more frequent among individuals with schizophrenia than among individuals without the condition; the inclination to make such errors may be phenotypic and related to hostility. Studies have suggested that source-monitoring difficulties in people with schizophrenia are due to failure encoding the source of self-generated items and the tendency to attribute new items to a previously presented source; another suggestion is that the affected perceive internal stimuli as real events. Several of the symptoms associated with schizophrenia imply that patients with the disorder are not capable of monitoring the initiation of certain kinds of self-generated thought, leading to a deficit called autonoetic agnosia: an impairment in the ability to identify self-generated mental events.

== See also ==
- Memory conformity
- Source amnesia
