= Julia Shaw (psychologist) =

German-Canadian criminal psychologist (born 1987)

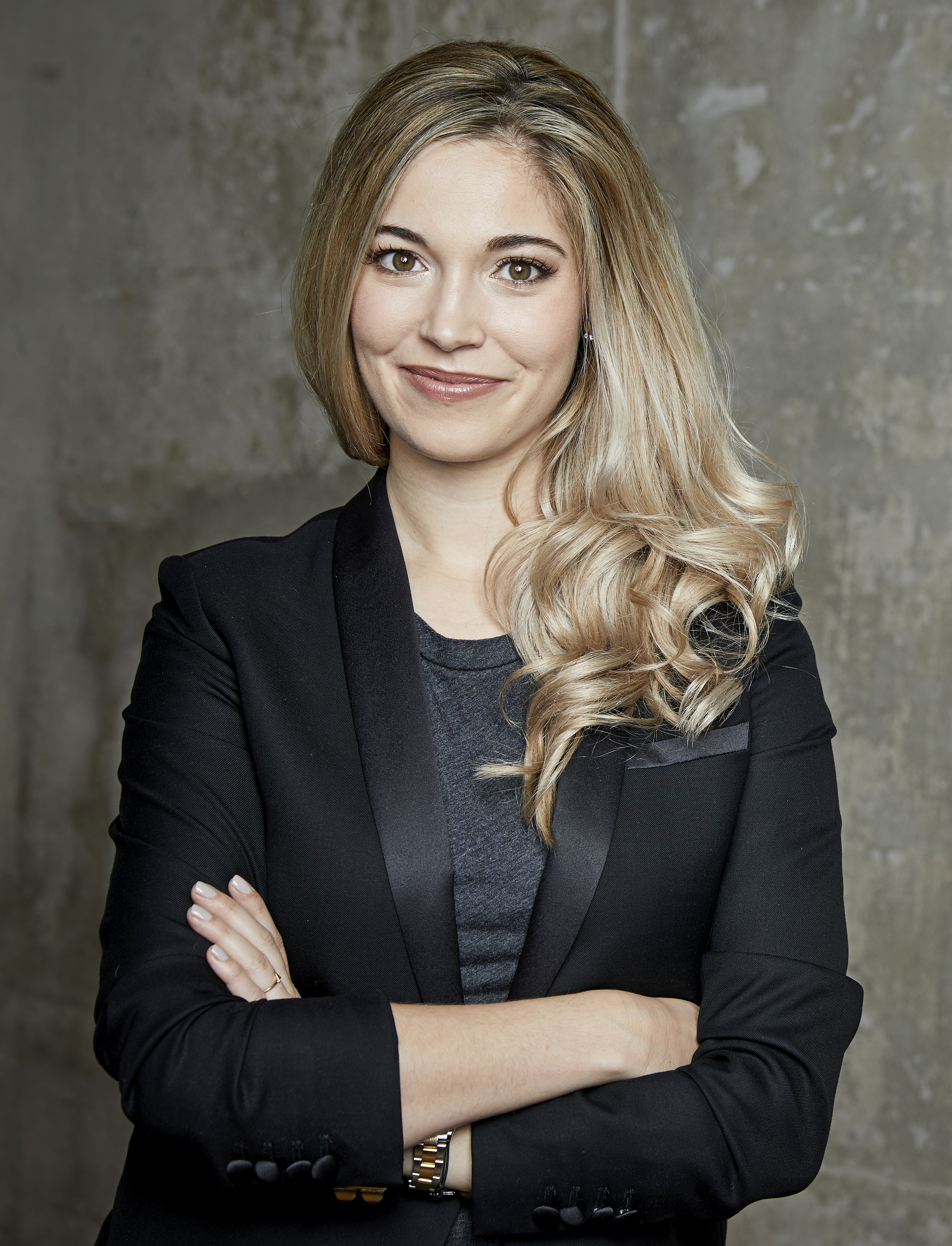
- Shaw in March 2018
- Born: January 20, 1987 (age 39); Cologne, North Rhine-Westphalia, West Germany
- Education: University of British Columbia
- Known for: False memory syndrome
- Partner: Paul Livingston (m. 2020)
- Scientific career
- Fields: Psychology, Criminology

Julia Shaw (born January 20, 1987) is a German-Canadian criminal psychologist and popular science writer.

== Education and academic career ==
Shaw was born on January 20, 1987 in Cologne, West Germany and grew up in Germany and Canada. In 2004 she started a BSc in psychology at the Simon Fraser University. She went on to complete a master's degree in Psychology and Law at Maastricht University in the Netherlands. In 2009, she returned to Canada and was awarded a PhD at the University of British Columbia (UBC). Her doctoral thesis was entitled "Constructing Rich False Memories of Committing Crime". Shaw remained in Canada and was a lecturer at UBC until 2013 when she became a lecturer in forensic psychology at the University of Bedfordshire. She joined London South Bank University as a Senior Lecturer in Criminology in 2015, before becoming an honorary Research Associate in Psychology at UCL in 2017. She is the founder of the Bisexual Research Group and completed an MA in Queer History at Goldsmiths, University of London.

Shaw specialises in false memories and how law enforcement can use "tactics [that] may lead people to recall crimes that never occurred". In one of her studies, she stated that in a controlled setting she was able to construct false memories of childhood events in 70% of participants using suggestive memory-retrieval techniques. The validity of this 70% finding has, however, been criticised by colleagues who recoded the data to conclude 26–30% of participants had false memories (with those with false beliefs without memory details not being counted as false memories in this recoding). Shaw addressed the criticism in a 2018 article in Psychological Science, where she explained that the original coding categorized false beliefs as false memories, in keeping with past research that argued memory and belief are difficult to truly distinguish.

== Public engagement ==
Shaw was a contributor to the popular science magazine Scientific American between 2015 and 2017. She contributed to the PBS documentary Memory Hackers (2016). In the same year Shaw released her first popular science book The Memory Illusion, which was about false memories. In 2017 she gave TEDx talks on false memories.

Shaw's second book Making Evil was about true crime. A review in The Guardian described it as "chattily written" but criticised her use of discredited experiments such as the Stanford prison experiment to illustrate her points. A reviewer for The Herald called it "fascinating" and "convincing". A review in the Frankfurter Allgemeine Zeitung criticised its simplistic writing and felt that it only provided discussion points for small talk at parties.

Between 2020 and 2023, Shaw co-hosted the true crime podcast Bad People with Danish comedian Sofie Hagen, on BBC Sounds. She also co-hosted the German language true crime podcast Böse with singer-songwriter Jazzy Gudd in 2022. In June 2022, she released her third book Bi, about the history of bisexuality. A review in The Guardian commented that it was "an impassioned attempt to bring decades of serious academic research out of the shadows" but criticised its use of terms interchangeably such as queer and LGBT+ which could lead to confusion. The Independent reviewer called it "well-researched, cogent, and compelling". Bad People returned in 2024 with new co-host Amber Haque. In the same year, Shaw co-hosted true crime documentary series The Misinvestigations of Romesh Ranganathan with the titular comedian.

Shaw has been a frequent contributor to several true crime documentary series such as The Greatest Crimes of All Time, World's Most Evil Killers, and ITVX's Killers: Caught on Camera—the latter of which she also narrates and serves as lead criminology/psychology expert.

== Personal life ==
Shaw came out as bisexual in 2019. She entered a civil partnership with employment law barrister Paul Livingston in 2020.

== Bibliography ==
- The Memory Illusion: Remembering, Forgetting, and the Science of False Memory. Random House, 2016, ISBN 978-1847947628
- Making Evil: The Science Behind Humanity's Dark Side. Canongate Books Ltd., 2019, ISBN 978-1786891303
- Bi: The Hidden Culture, History and Science of Bisexuality. Canongate Books Ltd., 2022, ISBN 978-1786898760
- Green Crime: Inside the Minds of the People Destroying the Planet, and how to Stop Them. Canongate Books, 2025, ISBN 978-1805301158
