= Lost in the mall technique =

Memory implantation technique

The "lost in the mall" technique or experiment is a memory implantation technique used to demonstrate that confabulations about events that never took place – such as having been lost in a shopping mall as a child – can be created through suggestions made to experimental subjects that their older relative was present at the time. It was first developed by Elizabeth Loftus and her undergraduate student Jim Coan, as support for the thesis that it is possible to implant entirely false memories in people. The technique was developed in the context of the debate about the existence of repressed memories and false memory syndrome.

== Study methodology ==
Coan designed the first lost in the mall experiment as an extra-credit assignment for a course in cognitive psychology. The professor—Loftus—invited her students to design and execute an experiment implanting false memories in subjects. Coan enlisted his mother, sister and brother as subjects. He assembled booklets containing four short narratives describing childhood events, and instructed them to try to remember as much as possible about each of the four events, and to write down those details over the course of six days. Unknown to the participants, one of the narratives was false; it described Coan's brother getting lost in a shopping mall at around the age of 5, then being rescued by an elderly person and reunited with his family. During the experiment, Coan's brother unwittingly invented several additional details of the false narrative. At the conclusion of the experiment during a tape-recorded debriefing when told that one of the narratives was false, Coan's brother could not identify which one was false and expressed disbelief when told. Coan later refined the study methodology for his senior thesis where he reports "all subjects were able to identify the false memory".

In a follow-up experiment, Elizabeth Loftus and Jacqueline Pickrell adapted the methods Coan had used on his brother in a formal study with 24 participants, about 25% of whom reported remembering the false event. The memory for the false event was usually reported to be less clear than the true events, and people generally used more words to describe the true events than the false events. At the end of the study when the participants were told that one of the 4 events was false, 5 out of the 24 participants failed to identify the lost in the mall event as the false event and instead picked one of the true events to be false. Loftus calls this study "existence proof" for the phenomenon of false memory creation and suggests that the false memory is formed as a result of the suggested event (being lost in a mall) being incorporated into already existing memories of going to the mall. With the passage of time it becomes harder for people to differentiate between what actually happened and what was imagined and they make memory errors. However, it remains to be seen how an older relative verifying the lost incident applies to what might happen in therapy.

The lost in the mall experiment has been replicated using claims by older relatives and extended with different ages of subjects. About 25 percent of the participants not only "remembered" the implanted memory but also filled in the missing details.

== Criticism of methodology and conclusions ==
The Lost in the Mall technique is generally accepted as a memory implantation study that is useful for investigating the effect of suggestions on memory. However, some have argued that it is not generalizable to memories for traumatic events.

An article in the journal Child Development by Pezdek and Hodges described an extension of the experiment: by using the subjects' family members to do the interviewing, their study was able to replicate Loftus's findings that memories of being lost in the mall could be created and were more likely to occur in young children. However, a much smaller number of children reported false memories of another untrue incident: that of a painful and embarrassing enema. Pezdek argues that less plausible implanted memories, such as being given an enema, are of a different caliber than the memories used in Loftus's work; and that the capability to implant plausible memories cannot be generalized to the capability to implant implausible memories.

Another article by Kenneth Pope in American Psychologist suggested possible confounding variables in the study, questioning whether the technique's ability to generate a false memory could be compared with the ability of a therapist to create a pseudomemory of childhood sexual abuse.

In a 1999 article in the journal Ethics & Behavior, Lynn Crook and Martha Dean, psychologists who made their career in part with recovered memories, questioned Loftus's Lost in the Mall study, arguing that the methods used were unethical and the results not generalizable to real-life memories of trauma. Loftus responded to their criticism, noting "exaggerations, omissions and errors" in Crook and Dean's description of the technique and mistakes about the study's representation in the media. Loftus made it clear that the Lost in the Mall study (and other studies using memory implantation techniques) in no way claimed that all memories of childhood sexual abuse discovered in therapy were false; instead, they tried to show how easy it was to manipulate human memory if an older relative said they witnessed the incident. Loftus also accused Crook of writing the article as part of a long series of efforts to discredit her integrity as a researcher and her work.

A later paper published by Crook and McEwen in 2019 cites Loftus's testimony in a 2017 court deposition that the study failed to control for "the possibility the participants were lost without their relatives’ knowledge," which allows for the possibility that participants were drawing upon details from true childhood experiences rather than experimental suggestion. Upon analyzing participants and conflicting data in the study, Crook and McEwen conclude that "the five subjects reported to the HSRC (Human Subjects Review Committee) in 1995 were able to differentiate between events they experienced and events that were suggested to them" and that "our examination suggests the experiences of the two subjects did not qualify" as "existence proof for false memory formation."

In 2019, Ruth Blizard and Morgan Shaw, both private-practice clinical psychologists/psychoanalysts who have consulted on recovered memory cases, published a criticism of Loftus and Pickrell (1995) that was heavily sourced from Lynn Crook in the trade journal Journal of Child Custody. They argue that False Memory Syndrome (FMS), along with Parental Alienation Syndrome (PAS), were developed in defense of parents accused of child abuse, as part of a larger movement to undermine prosecution of child abuse. Blizard and Shaw argue that the results of Loftus and Pickrell (1995) are inapplicable to recovered memories of abuse, as recovered memories of childhood abuse often involved repeated instances and content that is traumatic and sexual in nature. Because family members who claimed to witness the event corroborated the false memories in the Lost in the Mall study, Blizard and Shaw argue that the results are not applicable to potential suggestion in therapeutic practice. In 2020, a study documenting the implanting of repeated instances of false memories was posted on the PsyArXiv preprint server that explicitly disputed the Bizzard and Shaw argument related to repeated instances of abuse. The study was later published in the peer-reviewed journal Memory.

== See also ==
- Memory conformity
- Memory implantation
- Misinformation effect
