= The Seven Sins of Memory =

2001 book by Daniel Schacter

The Seven Sins of Memory: How the Mind Forgets and Remembers
- Author: Daniel L. Schacter
- Published: 2001
- Publisher: Houghton Mifflin
- ISBN: 0618040196

The Seven Sins of Memory: How the Mind Forgets and Remembers is a book by Daniel Schacter, former chair of Harvard University's Psychology Department and a leading memory researcher.

The book revolves around the theory that "the seven sins of memory" are similar to the seven deadly sins, and that if one tries to avoid committing these sins, it will help to improve one's ability to remember. Schacter argues that these features of human memory are not necessarily bad, and that they serve a useful purpose in memory. For instance, persistence is one of the sins of memory that can lead to things like post traumatic stress syndrome. However persistence is also necessary for long-term memory, and so it is essential, according to Schacter.

== Overview ==
Schacter asserts that "memory's malfunctions can be divided into seven fundamental transgressions or 'sins'." These are transience, absent-mindedness, blocking, misattribution, suggestibility, bias, and persistence. The first three are described as sins of omission, since the result is a failure to recall an idea, fact, or event. The other four sins (misattribution, suggestibility, bias, and persistence) are sins of commission, meaning that there is a form of memory present, but it is not of the desired fidelity or the desired fact, event, or ideas.

== Types of memory failure ==
=== Transience ===
Transience means the influence from one memory on another one. Failures are due to the general deterioration of a specific memory over time and are enhanced by interference of memories. There are two types of interference: proactive interference (old memory inhibits the ability to remember new memories properly), and retroactive interference (new memories inhibit the ability to remember old memories accurately). Typically, more information can be remembered of recent events than older events. This is especially true with episodic memory as compared to semantic memory, as "richly detailed evocative memories from the past" contain more multidimensional information than "general conceptual knowledge divested of a specific spatiotemporal context". Since memories of experiences contain multifaceted information—including sensory, spatial, and temporal details—, there are more areas inside an episodic memory susceptible to interference.

One of Schacter's examples of transience is a study of how well undergraduates remembered how they found out about the O. J. Simpson trial verdict immediately after, 15 months, and 32 months later. After three years, fewer than 30 percent remembered accurately, and nearly half had major errors.

=== Absent-mindedness ===
This form of memory failure involves a problem at the point where attention and memory interface. Common errors of this type include misplacing keys or eyeglasses, or forgetting appointments. The reason is that at the time of encoding sufficient attention was not paid to the fact that place or time etc. would later need to be recalled. Absentmindedness means here that the person's attention is focused on something different, and therefore misses part of the encoding.

=== Blocking ===
Blocking is when the brain tries to retrieve or encode information, but another memory interferes with it. Blocking is a primary cause of Tip of the tongue phenomenon (a temporary inaccessibility of stored information).

=== Misattribution ===
Misattribution entails correct recollection of information with incorrect recollection of the source of that information. For example, a person who witnesses a murder after watching a television program may incorrectly blame the murder on someone he or she saw on the television program. This error has profound consequences in legal systems because of its unacknowledged prevalence and the confidence which is often placed in the person's ability to impart correctly information critical to suspect identification.

One example Schacter gives of eyewitness misattribution occurred in connection with the Oklahoma City bombing in 1995. Two days before, the bomber rented a van, but an employee there reported seeing two men renting it together. One description fit the actual bomber, but the other description was soon determined to be of one of a pair of men who also rented a van the next day, and were unconnected with bombing.

Schacter also describes how to create misattribution errors using the DRM procedure. Subjects are read a list of words like sharp, pin, sewing, and so on, but not the word needle. Later subjects are given a second list of words including the word needle, and are asked to pick out which words were on the first list. Most of the time, subjects confidently assert that needle was on the first list.

=== Suggestibility ===
Suggestibility is somewhat similar to misattribution, but with the inclusion of overt suggestion. It is the acceptance of a false suggestion made by others. Memories of the past are often influenced by the manner in which they are recalled, and when subtle emphasis is placed on certain aspects which might seem likely to a specific type of memory, those emphasized aspects are sometimes incorporated into the recollection, whether or not they occurred. For example, a person sees a crime being committed by a redheaded man. Subsequently, after reading in the newspaper that the crime was committed by a brown-haired man, the witness "remembers" a brown-haired man instead of a redheaded man.

Loftus and Palmer's work into leading questions is an example of such suggestibility.

=== Bias ===
The sin of bias is similar to the sin of suggestibility in that one's current feelings and worldview distort remembrance of past events. This can pertain to specific incidents and the general conception one has of a certain period in one's life. Memories encoded with a certain amount of stimulation and emotion are more easily recalled. Thus, a contented adult might look back with fondness on his or her childhood, induced to do so by positive memories from that time, which might not be representative of his/her average mood during his/her childhood.

=== Persistence ===
This failure of the memory system involves the unwanted recall of information that is disturbing. The remembrance can range from a blunder on the job to a truly traumatic experience, and the persistent recall can lead to formation of phobias, post-traumatic stress disorder, and even suicide in particularly disturbing or intrusive instances.
