= Eyewitness testimony =

Account a witness gives in the courtroom of what they observed

Eyewitness testimony is the account a bystander or victim gives in the courtroom, describing what that person observed that occurred during the specific incident under investigation. Ideally this recollection of events is detailed; however, this is not always the case. This recollection is used as evidence to show what happened from a witness' point of view. Memory recall has been considered a credible source in the past but has recently come under attack as forensics can now support psychologists in their claim that memories and individual perceptions can be unreliable, manipulated, and biased. As a result of this, many countries, and states within the United States, are now attempting to make changes in how eyewitness testimony is presented in court. Eyewitness testimony is a specialized focus within cognitive psychology.

== Reliability ==
Psychologists have probed the reliability of eyewitness testimony since the beginning of the 20th century. One prominent pioneer was Hugo Münsterberg, whose controversial book On the Witness Stand (1908) demonstrated the fallibility of eyewitness accounts, but met with fierce criticism, particularly in legal circles. His ideas did, however, gain popularity with the public. Decades later, DNA testing would clear individuals convicted on the basis of errant eyewitness testimony. Studies by Scheck, Neufel, and Dwyer showed that many DNA-based exonerations involved eyewitness evidence.

In the 1970s and '80s, Bob Buckhout showed, inter alia, that eyewitness conditions can, within ethical and other constraints, be simulated on university campuses, and that large numbers of people can be mistaken.

In his study, "Nearly 2,000 witnesses can be wrong", Buckhout performed an experiment with 2,145 at-home viewers of a popular news broadcast. The television network played a 13-second clip of a mock robbery, produced by Buckhout. In the video, viewers watched a man in a hat run up behind a woman, knock her over, and take her purse. The perpetrator's face was only visible for about 3.5 seconds. The clip was followed by the announcer asking participants at home for cooperation in identifying the man who stole the purse. There was a lineup of six male suspects, each having a number associated with him. The people at home could call a number on their screen to report which suspect they believed was the perpetrator. The perpetrator was suspect number 2. Callers also had the option of reporting that they did not believe the perpetrator was in the lineup. Approximately equal contingents of participants chose suspects 1, 2, or 5, while the largest group of participants, about 25 percent, said they believed the perpetrator was not in the lineup. Even police precincts called in and reported the wrong man as the one they believed committed the crime. A key purpose of this experiment was aimed toward proving the need for better systems of getting suspect descriptions from eyewitnesses.

The question at hand is: What is there about an event that makes it so easy for eyewitness testimonies to be misremembered? As it pertains to witnessing crime in real time, “uniqueness is overshadowed by the conditions for observations”. The surprise or shock over the fact that a crime is happening puts the visceral experience of the event large, front and center of attention for a witness or a victim. However, this also has the effect of making it difficult for them to pay close attention to every material detail of the event; that is, their ability to remember any particular thing that potentially could be remembered will likely be diminished, because the ability to observe carefully, completely, accurately and objectively is handicapped by a number of factors constituent to the incident:

- The time of day – was there enough light to really see the event?
- Crowd density (or existence) at the scene;
- Was there anything uncommon or marked about the perpetrator's features?

The eyewitness's viewing conditions greatly impacts their ability to encode features about the perpetrator or crime in general which ultimately impacts their ability to retrieve said information.

A person's memory can be influenced by things seen or heard after a crime has occurred. This distortion is known as the post-event misinformation effect After a crime occurs, and an eyewitness comes forward, law enforcement tries to gather as much information as they can, in order to avoid any influence that may come from the environment, such as the media. Many times, when the crime is surrounded by much publicity, an eyewitness may experience source misattribution. Source misattribution occurs when a witness is mistaken about where or when they have the memory from. If a witness identification of the source of their retrieved memory turns out to be mistaken, then the witness will be considered unreliable.

While some witnesses see the entirety of a crime happen in front of them, others only witness part of a crime. These latter witnesses are more likely to experience confirmation bias. Witness expectations are to blame for the distortion that may come from confirmation bias. For example, Lindholm and Christianson (1998) found that witnesses of a mock crime, who did not witness the whole crime, nevertheless testified to what they expected would have happened. These expectations are normally similar across individuals, due to the details of the environment.

The responsibility to evaluate the credibility of eyewitness testimony falls on each individual juror, when such evidence is offered as testimony in a trial in the United States. Research has shown that mock juries are often unable to distinguish between a false and accurate eyewitness testimony. "Jurors" often appear to correlate the confidence level of the witness with the accuracy of their testimony. An overview of this research by Laub and Bornstein shows this to be an inaccurate gauge of accuracy.

== Working memory ==
Three ways affect influences memory: 1. emotional events can create positive and negative influences on the memory of an individual. 2. memory itself can manipulate and/or create emotions of an individual. 3. Working memory establish feelings as mental representations .

Feelings influence thoughts, decisions, and actions which means impairment can also be caused because of a person's emotional state. Emotional distracters can disrupt the working memory causing decreased activity in the processing portions of the brain.

In terms of neuroscience studies, the more negative presence of images within the brain, the more delay there is in terms of remembering and recalling events.

Depending on the ages of individuals this also has an impact on affective working memory processes. There are different decision making strategies an processes between children, adolescence, teens and adults, therefore, this can establish different perceptions of emotions, processing events, and recalling events with emotions that may be more negative to deal with in terms of age, or may be easier to recall. Depending on the events, the age, and the cognitive processing in terms of emotions, there can be more memory improvement or lack of knowledge and insight of even accounts.

Cognitive activity and representations in terms of the way a person makes decisions, processes events and emotions, and recalling decisions in terms of Affective Working Memory, this ties into the cognitive understanding and analysis testimonies and the psychological components on an individual depending on various circumstances.

Research on eyewitness testimony looks at systematic variables or estimator variables. Estimator variables are characteristics of the witness, event, testimony, or testimony evaluators. Systematic variables are variables that are, or have the possibility of, being controlled by the criminal justice system. Both sets of variables can be manipulated and studied during research, but only system variables can be controlled in actual procedure.

=== Estimator variables ===
==== Memory conformity ====
When a crime occurs with multiple witnesses, the first reaction of a witness is usually to ask another to confirm what they just saw. If multiple witnesses are required to stay at the scene of the crime, they are more likely to confer with each other about their own perspectives. This can lead to memory conformity. Memory conformity is when one reports another person's experience as their own. In some cases this can be a positive phenomenon, if enough people saw the right thing and were able to report it accurately. However, most memory conformity comes from wanting one's personal experience to match that of others. Individuals who identify a suspect with blonde hair will most likely change their answers upon learning two other people reported the suspect had brown hair; “People may agree with another person because of normative pressures to conform even when they believe the response is in error”

==== Short-term memory of identifier ====
In the event of witnessing a crime happening quickly, one can be susceptible to being in a state of shock. Once the initial surprise wears off, an individual can be left wondering what exactly happened. The problem with witnesses trying to recall such specific information is that short-term memory only keeps items in the brain for about 10 to 15 seconds. This means that if someone is not repeating everything they just witnessed over and over again to convert it over into their working or long-term memory, there is a good chance they can only remember the basic facts of the situation. Perceived or elapsed time can be altered during sudden or surprising events and influence eyewitness testimony.

==== Age of witness ====
Among children, suggestibility can be very high. Suggestibility is the term used when a witness accepts information after the actual event and incorporates it into the memory of the event itself. Children's developmental level (generally correlated with age) causes them to be more easily influenced by leading questions, misinformation, and other post-event details. Compared to older children, preschool-age children are more likely to fall victim to suggestions without the ability to focus solely on the facts of what happened.

Research on childhood memory shows that false memories can appear very early in the remembering process. They do not only happen when someone forgets or is influenced by leading questions later on. Age makes a difference in how children handle this. Older children are often better at realizing when something they remember does not match what really took place. The process is called recollection rejection. It helps them tell apart real experiences from imagined ones. However, the younger children are more inclined to believe in the imagined details if it matches what they saw in terms of the general feeling it evokes.

False impressions can start forming as children first take in and store information. When they focus on the main idea, or gist, they sometimes fill in missing parts in ways that seem to make sense. This can lead them to remember things that never actually happened. A review of developmental memory research found that this gist-based process appears in all age groups and can cause false recall even without misleading questions. These findings suggest that memory errors in children can arise naturally from how they process and understand events, not only from outside suggestion or later forgetting.

In addition, a recent meta-analysis found that older adults (over age 65) tend to be more susceptible to memory distortion brought about by misleading post-event information, compared to young adults.

==== Source monitoring ====
Source monitoring refers to the hypothetical cognitive processes by which people identify the sources of their recollections. "Most of the time, source monitoring attributions are performed very rapidly and without phenomenal awareness of decision making. Sometimes, however, these rapid, nonreflective processes fail to identify one or more dimensions of source." Applied to an eyewitness' memory of a crime, there are automatic consolidations taking place. There were events that occurred before and after the crime. They also have the influence of what others may have reported about the events of the crime. There are many things a witness might claim or believe to remember, but they may fail to recognize the source of that information.

==== Reconsolidation ====
Every time a witness reflects on an event, it is only natural that the memory can begin to fade or be changed due to reconsolidation. Reconsolidation is where reactivated memories enter a transient state of instability in which they are prone to disruption or change. While memory reconsolidation is often thought to weaken memories, it is also involved in strengthening them, and in updating them with new information. Schacter and Loftus (2013) cited that "Reconsolidation may be a mechanism for updating memories with current information to keep them relevant. In so doing, however, this updating mechanism may also contribute to changes and distortions in memory over time as a consequence of memory reactivation."

==== Reconstructive memory ====
Many of the early studies of memory demonstrated how memories can fail to be accurate records of experiences. Because jurors and judges do not have access to the original event, it is important to know whether a testimony is based on actual experience or not.

Furthermore, emotional arousal can increase a witness’ confidence in their testimony. In moments of intense shock, flashbulb memories can be formed. Flashbulb memories are a vivid memory of how a person learned about a shocking or surprising event. Still, these memories are highly susceptible to suggestion. A number of studies suggest that these potent memories are inaccurate. When rehearsing the memory post-encoding factors of retelling alter the memory over time. Because of this, the memory becomes inaccurate. Due to the intense emotional association with the memory, the witness’ insists that their memory is a fact.

In a 1932 study, Frederic Bartlett demonstrated how serial reproduction of a story distorted accuracy in recalling information. He told participants a complicated Native American story and had them repeat it over a series of intervals. With each repetition, the stories were altered. Even when participants recalled accurate information, they filled in gaps with information that would fit their personal experiences. His work showed long-term memory to be adaptable. Bartlett viewed schemas as a major cause of this occurrence. People attempt to place past events into existing representations of the world, making the memory more coherent. Instead of remembering precise details about commonplace occurrences, a schema is developed. A schema is a generalization formed mentally based on experience. The common use of these schemas suggests that memory is not an identical reproduction of experience, but a combination of actual events with already existing schemas. Bartlett summarized this issue, explaining

[M]emory is personal, not because of some intangible and hypothetical persisting ‘self ’, which receives and maintains innumerable traces, restimulating them whenever it needs; but because the mechanism of adult human memory demands an organisation of ‘schemata’ depending upon an interplay of appetites, instincts, interests and ideas peculiar to any given subject. Thus if, as in some pathological cases, these active sources of the ‘schemata’ get cut off from one another, the peculiar personal attributes of what is remembered fail to appear.

In a study by Talarico and Rubin, it was found that although many had high confidence in their accuracy in recalling 9/11, these memories were not fully accurate. Although these memories were especially significant, participants recalled 9/11 flashbulb memories were no more accurate than mundane memories. Overall, the vividness of emotionally charged memories causes witness’ to have greater faith in their recollection despite being susceptible to forgetting over time.

Further research of schemas shows memories that are inconsistent with a schema decay faster than those that match up with a schema. Tuckey and Brewer found pieces of information that were inconsistent with a typical robbery decayed much faster than those that were schema consistent over a 12-week period, unless the information stood out as being extremely unusual. The use of schemas has been shown to increase the accuracy of recall of schema-consistent information but this comes at the cost of decreased recall of schema-inconsistent information.

Additional research has demonstrated that memory is not only influenced by schemas and emotions, but also by the way post-event information is introduced. In a classic study, Loftus and Palmer (1974) showed that participants' recollection of a car accident varied significantly depending on the phrasing of the questions they were asked. For example, participants who were asked how fast the cars were going when they "smashed" into each other estimated higher speeds than those asked when the cars "hit" each other. This phenomenon, known as the misinformation effect, highlights how suggestive questioning can distort memory. Supporting this, Tuckey and Brewer (2003) found that schema-consistent information is more likely to be retained over time, while inconsistent details tend to decay unless they are highly distinctive. These findings further emphasize the reconstructive nature of memory and the need for caution in how eyewitnesses are questioned.

Overall, it is essential to consider a person’s affect when assessing eyewitness testimony. Intense feelings of fear and shock can leave a person feeling as though they have a concrete hold of events despite being as flawed as any ordinary memory. Validating a witness’ confidence in their recall can lead to redirection of a trial. While it is important to consider eyewitness testimony, it is essential to view it as subjective rather than fact.

==== Misinformation effect ====
Elizabeth Loftus is one of the leading psychologists in the field of eyewitness testimony. She provided extensive research on this topic, revolutionizing the field with her bold stance that challenges the credibility of eyewitness testimony in court. She suggests that memory is not reliable and goes to great lengths to provide support for her arguments. She mainly focuses on the integration of misinformation with the original memory, forming a new memory. Some of her most convincing experiments support this claim:

1. In one of her experiments, Loftus demonstrates that false verbal Information can integrate with original memory. Participants were presented with either truthful information or misleading information, and overall it showed that even the false information verbally presented became part of the memory after the participant was asked to recall details. This happens because of one of two reasons. First, it can alter the memory, incorporating the misinformation in with the actual, true memory. Second, the original memory and new information may both reside in memory in turn creating two conflicting ideas that compete in recall.
2. Loftus conducted more experiments to prove the reliability of expert psychological testimony versus the accepted basic eyewitness testimony. It was found that jurors who hear about a violent crime are more likely to convict a defendant than of one from a nonviolent crime. To reduce this tendency for a juror to quickly accuse, and perhaps wrongly accuse, choosing to utilize expert psychological testimony causes the juror to critically appraise the eyewitness testimony, instead of quickly reaching a faulty verdict.
3. Also, it has been shown that intelligence and gender has a role in the ability of accurate memory recall. Participants were measured in eyewitness performance in two areas: 1) the ability to resist adding misinformation to the memory and 2) accuracy of recalling the incident and person. It showed that when a woman was recalling information about a woman, the resistance to false details was higher and the recall was more accurate. If a man was recalling an incident involving a man, similarly the recall was more accurate. However, when dealing with opposite genders, the participants gave into the suggestibility (misinformation) more easily and demonstrated less accuracy.
4. Facial recognition is a good indicator of how easily memories can be manipulated. In this specific experiment, if a misleading feature was presented, more than a third of the participants recalled that detail. With a specific detail, almost 70% of people claimed that it had been there, when it had not been present.

==== Weapons focus ====
The Weapon Focus Effect is one such factor. When a weapon is present during a crime, victims tend to be more focused on the weapon rather than the perpetrator’s features. In this way, eyewitness testimony is greatly affected by the intense fear present during an incident.

When an eyewitness of a crime focuses their attention on a weapon, it reduces their attention to other details, and thus, diminishes the reliability of their memory of the incident. The presence of a weapon impacts some details of the crime committed, such as what the assailant is wearing or other surrounding visual markers. The use of lineups shows its production isn't as impacted, with certain studies showing no effect, while others having less accuracy. The first controlled experiment on weapons focus (I) was conducted by Elizabeth Loftus. Participants were shown slides of individuals in a fast-food restaurant, either (c) handing a check to the cashier or (g) pointing a gun at the cashier. Following this, participants were given a short retention interval, after which they completed a questionnaire, and were then shown a fair-perpetrator 12-person lineup. In the first experiment, the participant's memory was slightly worse. In the second, the assailant was correctly identified slightly less often in the weapon condition. The questionnaire and line-up results of experiment II showed those in the g group with worse memory, compared to the control-conditioned group.

=== Systematic variables ===
==== Type of questioning ====
As early as 1900, psychologists like Alfred Binet recorded how the phrasing of questioning during an investigation could alter witness response. Binet believed people were highly susceptible to suggestion, and called for a better approach to questioning witnesses.

A prime example of this is in the initial questioning process conducted by authorities. As an official investigation launches, police ask many questions ranging from race to weight of the perpetrator. All the information collected can be used to pull photographs of prime suspects or lead to a line up. If police suggest their own opinions, whether verbal or non-verbal, it can encourage a witness to change their mind or lead to guessing.

Studies conducted by Crombag (1996) discovered that in an incident involving a crew attempting to return to the airport but were unable to maintain flight and crashed into an 11-story apartment building. Though no cameras caught the moment of impact on film, many news stations covered the tragedy with footage taken after impact. Ten months after the event, the researchers interviewed people about the crash. According to theories about flashbulb memory, the intense shock of the event should have made the memory of the event incredibly accurate. This same logic is often applied to those who witness a criminal act. To test this assumption, participants were asked questions that planted false information about the event. Fifty-five percent of subjects reported having watched the moment of impact on television and recalled the moment the plane broke out in flames-even though it was impossible for them to have seen either of these occurrences. One researcher remarked, "[V]ery critical sense would have made our subjects realize that the implanted information could not possibly be true. We are still at a loss as to why so few of them realized this."

A survey of research on the matter confirm eyewitness testimony consistently changes over time and based on the type of questioning. The approach investigators and lawyers take in their questioning has repeatedly shown to alter eyewitness response. One study showed changing certain words and phrases resulted in an increase in overall estimations of witnesses.

== Improving eyewitness testimony ==
Law enforcement, legal professions, and psychologists have worked together in attempts to make eyewitness testimony more reliable and accurate. Geiselman, Fisher, MacKinnon, and Holland saw much improvement in eyewitness memory with an interview procedure they referred to as the cognitive interview. The approach focuses on making witness aware of all events surrounding a crime without generating false memories or inventing details. In this tactic, the interviewer builds a rapport with the witness before asking any questions. They then allow the witness to provide an open ended account of the situation. The interviewer then asks follow up questions to clarify the witness' account, reminding the witness it is acceptable to be unsure and move on. This approach guides the witness over a rigid protocol. When implemented correctly, the CI showed more accuracy and efficiency without additional incorrect information being generated.

Currently, this is the U.S. Department of Justice's suggested method for law enforcement officials to use in obtaining information from witnesses. Programs training officers in this method have been developed outside the U.S. in many European countries, as well as Australia, New Zealand, and Israel.

While some analysis of police interviewing technique reveals this change towards CI interviewing is not put into effect by many officials in the US and the U.K., it is still considered to be the most effective means of decreasing error in eyewitness testimony.

=== Innocence Project ===
Emotional status is an imperative element of accurate eyewitness testimony. On the one hand, memory enhancement can occur when high emotional arousal occurs. However, strong feelings such as distress can cause memory distortions.

Over the last decade, the Innocence Project has been gaining notoriety for its work within the judicial system providing help in exonerating those who have been wrongfully accused of various crimes. To do their part, the following are specific ways that they have suggested eyewitness identification can be more reliable.

Emotional disposition can influence eye-witness testimony depending on the intensity of events and emotions of an individual. The more intense a situation and event, the more intense the cognitive stimulation is on a witness which can lead to either not wanting to recall events due to the intense psychological trauma, or re-calling specific details for psychological reassurance and closure.

==== The "double-blind" procedure or use of a blind administrator ====
A blind administrator lineup setting is where the person administering the lineup, i.e. an officer, does not know who the suspect actually is. By doing this, the officer is unable to give verbal indication to the eyewitness.

==== Instructions ====
Instructions can be key for eyewitness identifications. Proper instructions, such as telling them it is okay to not identify anyone, should be given before eyewitnesses try to identify an individual.

==== Composing the lineup ====
Composing the lineup is straight forward. If the suspect is in the lineup, the goal is to make he/she blend in with the people next to them. All people chosen to participate in the lineup should look like the initial descriptions of eyewitnesses.

When emotions are significantly important in terms of eye-witness accounts for facial-recognition processes. The change of emotion brought onto a person identifying a person from a more neutral event many not have as much of a recollection of the events than an eye-witness who not only experienced a traumatic event but identifies the person who inflicted trauma onto the person themselves. Therefore there can be more memorized events from the impact of the eye-witness seeing the perpetrator, or depending on the psychological impact, there could be details withheld, but still leading closer to who and what the perpetrator did based on the reaction of the eye-witness.

==== Confidence statements ====
Confidence statements are statements provided by the eyewitness that will tell how confident they were in the choices they made in the lineup. It's recommended to obtain the confidence statement as soon as the identification is made and for it to be recorded.

==== The lineup procedure should be documented ====
The lineup procedure should be documented by any means available. Most commonly video surveillance is used during the procedure. In some instances, it may be helpful to have written documents providing descriptions of the procedure.

== Procedural reforms ==
Experts debate what changes need to occur in the legal process in response to research on inaccuracy of eyewitness testimony but there are general recommendations.

=== Jury guidelines ===
It has been suggested that the jury be given a checklist to evaluate eyewitness testimony when given in court. R. J. Shafer offers this checklist for evaluating eyewitness testimony:

- How well could the eyewitness observe the thing he reports? Were his senses equal to the observation? Was his physical location suitable to sight, hearing, touch? Did he have the proper social ability to observe: did he understand the language, have other expertise required (e.g., law, military)?
- When did he report in relation to his observation? Soon? Much later?
- Are there additional clues to intended veracity? Was he indifferent on the subject reported, thus probably not intending distortion? Did he make statements damaging to himself, thus probably not seeking to distort? Did he give incidental or casual information, almost certainly not intended to mislead?
- Do his statements seem inherently improbable: e.g., contrary to human nature, or in conflict with what we know?
- Remember that some types of information are easier to observe and report on than others.
- Are there inner contradictions in the testimony?

=== Judge guidelines ===
In 2011, the New Jersey Supreme Court created new rules for the admissibility of eyewitness testimony in court. The new rules require judges to explain to jurors any influences that may heighten the risk for error in the testimony. The rules are part of nationwide court reform that attempts to improve the validity of eyewitness testimony and lower the rate of false conviction.

== See also ==
- Anecdotal evidence – Evidence relying on personal testimony
- Confabulation – Recall of fabricated, misinterpreted or distorted memories (false memory)
- Forensic psychology – Connecting psychology and the justice system
- Legal psychology – Psychological research of the law
- Mistaken identity
