= Mistaken identity =

Mistaken identity or Mistaken Identity may refer to:

- Eyewitness misidentification
- Mistaken identity (defense), a defense in criminal law which claims the innocence due to mistakes in eyewitness identification
- Mistaken identity (plot device), literary device
- Mistaken identification of any kind

== Titles ==
=== Music ===
- Mistaken Identity (Kim Carnes album), 1981, or its title song
- Mistaken Identity (Donna Summer album), 1991
- Mistaken Identity (Vernon Reid album), 1996
- Mistaken Identity (Delta Goodrem album), 2004
  - "Mistaken Identity" (Delta Goodrem song), 2005, from the album of the same name
- "Mistaken Identity", a song by Janis Ian from The Secret Life of J. Eddy Fink
- "Mistaken Identity", a song by Van Morrison from Latest Record Project, Volume 1

=== Film and television ===
- Mistaken Identity, a 1940s American race film, footage of which was re-used in Murder with Music (1948)
- Mistaken Identity (TV series), Philippine drama series
- "Mistaken Identity" / "Easy Peasy Rider", an Angry Beavers episode
- "Mistaken Identity" (The Fresh Prince of Bel-Air), a The Fresh Prince of Bel-Air episode
- Mistaken Identity (film), a 1996 Canadian thriller film
- "Mistaken Identity" (Bad Girls), a 2000 television episode

=== Literature ===
- Mistaken Identity, novel in the Rosato & Associates series
- Mistaken Identity: Two Families, One Survivor, Unwavering Hope, a 2008 non-fiction book with multiple authors

== See also ==
- Mistaken (disambiguation)
- Delusional misidentification syndrome
