= Eyewitness memory =

Imperfect recall of a crime or other dramatic event

Eyewitness memory is a person's episodic memory for a crime or other witnessed dramatic event. Eyewitness testimony is often relied upon in the judicial system. It can also refer to an individual's memory for a face, where they are required to remember the face of their perpetrator, for example. However, the accuracy of eyewitness memories is sometimes questioned because there are many factors that can act during encoding and retrieval of the witnessed event which may adversely affect the creation and maintenance of the memory for the event. Experts have found evidence to suggest that eyewitness memory is fallible.

It has long been speculated that mistaken eyewitness identification plays a major role in the wrongful conviction of innocent individuals. A growing body of research now supports this speculation, indicating that mistaken eyewitness identification is responsible for more convictions of the innocent than all other factors combined. This may be due to the fact that details of unpleasant emotional events are recalled poorly compared to neutral events. States of high emotional arousal, which occur during a stressful or traumatic event, lead to less efficient memory processing.

The Innocence Project determined that 75% of the 239 DNA exoneration cases had occurred due to inaccurate eyewitness testimony. It is important to inform the public about the flawed nature of eyewitness memory and the difficulties relating to its use in the criminal justice system so that eyewitness accounts are not viewed as the absolute truth.

== Encoding ==
=== During the event ===
==== Challenges of identifying faces ====
People struggle to identify faces in person or from photos, a difficulty arising from the encoding of faces. When participants were given a basic memory test from an array of photos or a lineup, they struggled to accurately identify the images and had low recognition. This finding provides a starting point for estimating the accuracy of eyewitnesses' identification of others involved in a traumatic event. It can only get more challenging for a person to accurately encode a face when they themselves are experiencing a traumatic event. The ability to more accurately encode and ultimately retrieve the memory of a person's face greatly depends on the viewing conditions. Because courts rely on eyewitness facial recognition, it is important to acknowledge that identification is not always accurate. Face-specific cognitive and neural processes show contributions to holistic processing and recognition in the episodic memories of eyewitnesses. Unreliability of eyewitness identifications may be a result of mismatching between how faces are holistically processed and how composite systems retrieve features in faces during an event.

==== Other-race effect ====
The other-race effect (i.e. the own-race bias, cross-race effect, other-ethnicity effect, same-race advantage) is one factor thought to impact the accuracy of facial recognition. Studies investigating this effect have shown that a person is better able to recognize faces that match their own race but are less reliable at identifying other more unfamiliar races, thus inhibiting encoding. Various explanations for this effect have been proposed. The perceptual expertise account suggests that with an increase of exposure to one's own race, perceptual mechanisms develop which allow people to be more proficient at remembering faces of their own race. The socio-cognitive account predicts that motivational and/or attentional components over focus on the race of a person. Another hypothesis is that each race pays attention to certain facial details to differentiate between faces. However, other races might not encode these same features. A final suggestion is that faces of the same race are encoded more deeply, leading a witness to have a more detailed memory for those faces; but there has not been much research to support this hypothesis. Research on the other race effect has mainly focused on the African American and Caucasian races. Most research has shown that white eyewitnesses exhibit the other-race effect, however this effect does extend to other races too. In general, memory is an individual process and that conceptualization of race causes racial ambiguity in facial recognition. Mono-racial eyewitnesses may depend on categorization more than multiracial eyewitnesses, who develop a more fluid concept of race. Perception may affect the immediate encoding of these unreliable notions due to prejudices, which can influence the speed of processing and classification of racially ambiguous targets. The ambiguity in eyewitness memory facial recognition can be attributed to the divergent strategies that are used when under the influence of racial bias. This phenomenon is not limited to race. Stereotypes of any kind (whether they be related to age, gender, etc.) can affect the encoding of information at the time of the event. For example, if one is held at gunpoint by two individuals, one of whom is a man and the other is a woman wearing a hat, the victim may quickly fall back on the belief that men are more likely to be aggressors. Consequently, the victim may encode the situation as involving two male assailants, yielding problematic effects in the process of identifying the assailants later on.

==== Stress and trauma ====
Stress or trauma during an event can affect the encoding of the memory. Traumatic events may cause memory to be repressed out of conscious awareness. An inability to access the repressed memory is argued to occur in cases involving child sexual abuse. Another way encoding a memory can be affected is when the person involved in a traumatic event experiences dissociation; mentally removing themselves from the situation, which may serve as a coping mechanism. Lastly, trauma may induce a flashbulb effect; the witness believes they vividly remember significant details of a salient event, although accuracy must be determined of such memories . In legal settings the mental state of an individual at both witnessing a crime and in testimony can affect the success of their memory retrieval. Stress in small amounts is thought to aid memory, whereby stress hormones released by the amygdala promote the consolidation of emotional memories. Nevertheless, stress in high amounts may hinder memory performance. Witnesses of severe crimes or trauma can develop further complications, such as posttraumatic stress disorder (PTSD) or even psychogenic amnesia.

===== Post traumatic stress disorder =====
Explicit memory (used in legal testimony) is affected by post traumatic stress disorder (PTSD); individuals diagnosed with PTSD can struggle to recall explicit events from their memory, usually those which are especially traumatic events. This may be due to the individual preferring not to think about the unpleasant memory, which they may rather forget or from developing dissociation as a method to cope. Implicit memory, on the other hand, does not seem to be affected in the same way that explicit memory does, rather some individuals with PTSD may score higher on implicit memory tests than non-PTSD individuals.

===== Psychogenic amnesia =====
Psychogenic amnesia (or dissociative amnesia) can affect explicit memory for a particular event. Those with psychogenic amnesia present impaired memory functioning in their personal life histories without a discernable neurological cause. Most often cases of psychogenic amnesia occur after witnessing an extremely violent crime or trauma, such as war. This also goes for experiencing a crime, such as childhood sexual abuse. The dissociation after the event can lead to a higher chance of revictimisation.

===== Mood-congruency effect =====
Everyday memory can be affected by factors such as stress or mood. The 'mood congruency' effect refers to memory being aided by a matching of mood at the encoding/learning stage to the retrieval stage. If a memory is encoded under stressful conditions it may be more likely that the memory is better recalled if stress levels at retrieval are congruent to stress levels at encoding. Mood congruency may affect a witnesses ability to recall a highly stressful crime, if conditions of encoding and retrieval are different. Moderate amounts of stress may be beneficial to memory by the release of corticosteroids. Conversely, too much stress (and therefore an extreme influx of corticosteroids) can affect function of the hippocampus and therefore hinder memory. Very high levels of corticosteroid release may be very detrimental for memory.

==== Weapon focus ====
The weapon focus effect suggests that the presence of a weapon narrows a person's attention, thus affects eyewitness memory. A person focuses on the central detail (for example, the weapon) and loses focus on the peripheral details thus resulting in worse perpetrator recall. While the weapon is remembered clearly, the memories of the other details of the scene suffer. The weapon focus effect occurs because additional items require more visual attention, therefore they are frequently not processed. This increased focus of attention on central aspects takes away attentional resources from peripheral details. For example, if a gun was brought into a school, it would attract significant amount of attention, because students are not used to seeing that item. When participants were watching a slideshow, and were seeing an unusual stimulus item, their reaction times were slower (regardless whether the stimulus was dangerous) in comparison to reaction times for more frequent stimulus. When the item was dangerous (i.e. a weapon), participants had a lower accuracy and confidence than the control group's. Another hypothesis is that seeing a weapon might cause an aroused state. In an aroused state, people focus on central details instead of peripheral ones.

==== Interference ====
The testimony of a witness can lose validity due to too many external stimuli, that may affect what was witnessed during the crime, and therefore obstruct memory. For example, if an individual witnesses a car accident on a very public street, there may be too many cues distracting the witness from the main focus. Numerous interfering stimulus inputs may suppress the importance of the stimulus of focus, the accident. This can degrade the memory traces of the event, and diminish the representation of those memories. This is known as the cue-overload principle.

=== After the event ===
Memory becomes susceptible to contamination when witnesses discuss the event with others and as time passes. This is because memory traces blend with other stories and events that the witness is exposed to after the stressful or traumatic event Because memory is subject to contamination, the most reliable test of a memory is the initial test. Police procedures can reduce the effects of contamination on memory with proper testing protocols.

==== Misinformation effect ====
Witnesses can be subject to memory distortions that can alter their account of events. It is of particular interest that the memory of an eyewitness can become compromised by other information, such that an individual's memory becomes biased. This can increase eyewitnesses sensitivity to the misinformation effect. Individuals report what they believe to have witnessed at the time of the crime, even though this may be the result of a false memory. These effects can be a result of post-event information. When the memory is weaker or gained under less than optimal viewing conditions, the more likely for their memory to be distorted and more subject to suggestibility. It is very important to provide witnesses with helpful response options on memory tests and to be warned of misleading influences that might affect how the memory of the event is recalled at a later time. Many employees, police force workers, and others are trained in post-warning in order to reduce influences on the misinformation effect, which can be predicted before crime. In their studies, many researchers use eyewitnesses to study retrieval-blocking effects, which interfere with a witness' ability to recall information. Misleading information prior to the event can also influence misinformation effects. Other studies also address how the misinformation effect seems to amplify over increasing recall. Discussing events and being questioned multiple times may cause various versions of the testimonies. However, the earliest records prove to be the most accurate due to a minimized misinformation effect. In one study, repeated recall of a traumatic event did not increase resistance to misinformation, nor did it increase susceptibility to information. This result may be due participants being presented both forms of additive and contradictory misinformation.

==== Unconscious transference ====
Many mistaken identifications are the result of unconscious transference, or the inability to distinguish between the perpetrator and another person who was encountered in a different context. In many of these cases, the culprit is confused with a different person who was present at the crime scene. Implicit processing takes place during the event, in which the witness encodes the general features of innocent bystanders, creating a sense of familiarity. At retrieval, this familiarity could cause people who were merely present in the crime scene to be confused with the culprit. After viewing a video of a crime involving a thief and two innocent bystanders, participants were asked to identify the perpetrator from a lineup including the three persons present in the video and three other people never before encountered. Most participants falsely identified an innocent person from the lineup. Furthermore, participants were more likely to misidentify one of the two innocent confederates in the video than one of the three unfamiliar people. Unconscious transference occurs in this instance when the witness misattributes his or her sense of familiarity of the perpetrator to a bystander. This confusing effect of familiarity is found in the mug shot procedure as well. The presentation of mug shot arrays alone does not seem to influence identification accuracy. However, this presentation can be influential if the police lineups include individuals who were earlier featured in the mug shot array. Individuals appearing in police lineups that also appeared in previous photo arrays may be identified as quickly as identifying the actual target. Therefore, in cases where a suspect is identified from mug shots following a line-up, it is uncertain whether the line-up identification is a result of the recognition of the perpetrator or of the detection of a person seen previously in mug shots.

== Retrieval ==
=== Lineups ===
A police lineup is a method for an eyewitness to identify a perpetrator by viewing a series of photos, or a live group of suspects. One possible outcome of a lineup is that the eyewitness can correctly identify the criminal. Another outcome is that the eyewitness can correctly state that the criminal is not in the lineup. A third option is that the eyewitness can fail to recognize that the culprit is present. Lastly, the eyewitness can incorrectly select another suspect. The ideal result is to correctly identify the offender, and the worst outcome is to mistakenly identify an innocent. When eyewitness have more optimal viewpoints of the crime, such as being close with no obstruction to their view, the more accurately they are able to encode the perpetrator and ultimately the easier the retrieval during a lineup.

==== Police role in lineup ====
There are specific guidelines for police to follow when administering a lineup, to reduce bias in the lineup and increase the accuracy of eyewitness judgements. Police must reduce the pressure that eyewitnesses feel to select a criminal from an array of photos or persons. They should make sure that the eyewitness is aware that the perpetrator might not be in the lineup. Also, police should conduct a double blind procedure that does not allow them to see the lineup. This prevents police from giving the eyewitness any information, intentional or not, about who in the lineup is a police suspect. It also prevents the police from giving any feedback to the eyewitness. Feedback can produce a false confidence in the witness' selection. When overseeing a lineup, the police can use speed of recognition to determine the validity of the identification. If the witness quickly identifies the perpetrator, then the selection is more likely to be correct. A lineup may be ineffective as the pressure on the witness to identify someone who they believe is the perpetrator can lead to false identifications. To prove this we could use the Deese-Roediger-McDermott (DRM) paradigm which is used in psychology experiments as a technique that explores the relationship between memory, language, and cognition. Participants are presented with a list of words or images that are semantically related to a certain word that is not actually on the list. A study done by Daisuke, Matsui, & Yuji showed that using the Deese-Roediger-McDermott paradigm has demonstrated that false memory can be produced by the morphological characteristics of a list. Morphological characteristics of the list refer to the structural features of a list of words that are presented to participants for example using the words smile, laughter, and joke, participants were more likely to falsely remember a smiling face, even if no such face was actually presented. This suggests that witnesses may be prone to false identification even without intentional manipulation. Alternative methods of identification, such as photo arrays and sequential lineups, are recommended to reduce the risk of false identifications and improve the accuracy of criminal investigations.

==== Style of lineup ====
A sequential lineup presents a witness with a series of photos one at a time, requiring the participant to identify if each photo matches his/her memory before moving forward. The witness does not know how many photos are in the group. In a simultaneous lineup, the photos or suspects are viewed together. Sequential lineups produce fewer identifications, since they are more challenging, and require absolute judgement. This means that the decision regarding the matching of the memory to the photo is independently made. On the other hand, a simultaneous lineup requires relative judgement, as the decision is not independent of the other possibilities. An absolute judgment is a judgment that requires the person to be 100 percent certain in their choice where a relative judgment is when someone makes up their mind based on what looks the closest. However, researchers such as Dr. Gary Wells from Iowa State University claim "during simultaneous lineups, witnesses use relative judgment, meaning that they compare lineup photographs or members to each other, rather than to their memory of the offender." Sequential lineups have been preferred historically, seeing as they do not rely on relative judgment. However, recent data suggests the preference for sequential lineups over simultaneous lineups may not be empirically supported. Individuals who participate in sequential lineups are less likely to make a selection at all, regardless if the selection is accurate or not. This suggests the sequential lineup fosters a more conservative shift in criterion to make a selection rather than an increased ability to pick the true perpetrator. Consequently, further research is needed before offering recommendations to police departments.

==== Size of lineup ====
Lineup members should have diverse characteristics so that lineups are not biased toward or against the suspect. If the appearance of a person stands out amongst the otherwise indistinctive crowd, then an eyewitness is more likely to select that person regardless of their own recollection of the criminal. According to Schuster (2007), the suspect, if he is in the in person lineup or in a picture lineup, should not stand out from the others in the lineup. People's eyes are drawn to what is different. If you make sure that all the men or women in the pictures have a similar appearance, have the same background in their picture, race, age, and are wearing the same or similar clothing, just to name a few, then the risk of getting a false positive will decrease. Thus, this lineup is suggestive. Fillers should be added to the lineup in order to depict a broad spectrum of characteristics, but must match any known description of the offender. If lineup members do not all match the known description of the offender then the lineup is biased toward the suspect. Biased lineups have been shown to increase misidentifications, particularly in target-absent lineups. Increasing the nominal size of a lineup (the actual number of suspects that are compiled) often decreases the potential for a wrong selection. Functional size also plays a role in lineup bias. Functional size is the reciprocal of the fraction of mock witnesses that choose the suspect from a lineup. For example, in a lineup of nominal size 5, if 15 out of 30 mock witnesses (randomly chosen individuals that did not experience the offence) choose the suspect, the functional size of the lineup is the reciprocal of 15/30, which is 30/15, or 2. So although the lineup has 5 members, functionally it only has 2. Effective size is the number of probable suspects. Police use these three numbers to evaluate a lineup.

==== Viewpoints ====
Many studies, as well as police procedures, are dependent on photo lineups or police lineups where the eyewitness views the suspects from a distance. This procedure is done in an attempt to eliminate suspects and identify the perpetrator. These types of lineups allow only small degrees of visual information for the eyewitness, such as limited viewing angles, which restrict the level of detail compared to a computerized virtual lineup where witnesses can see the targets from multiple angles and distances. One might anticipate that examination of the suspects from unlimited viewpoints would allow for better recognition cues, than when compared to limited views. However, unlimited visual information may be disadvantageous and counterproductive if the information offered at the time of retrieval was not actually present at the time of memory encoding. For example, if an eyewitness only saw the face of the perpetrator from one angle, seeing the lineup participants from other viewpoints might be distracting. Other studies have demonstrated that unlimited viewpoints do improve accuracy in police lineups. The eyewitness accuracy improves when the distance between the suspect and witness matches the distance during the initial witnessing of the crime.

==== Retroactive interference ====
Another phenomenon that may interfere with an eyewitness' memory is retroactive interference. This occurs when new information is processed that obstructs the retrieval of old information. A common source of interference that may occur after the event of a crime is the reporting of the crime. Police investigations include questioning that is often suggestive. The processing of new information may disrupt or entirely replace old information. If a police officer has reason to believe that a suspect is guilty the interrogator's bias can influence the eyewitness' memory. The interrogators can also put pressure on witnesses causing them to want to select a perpetrator from a police lineup. Eyewitnesses are often unsuspecting of the interrogator bias and believe their memories to be uncontaminated.

==== Co-witness contamination ====
The presence of a co-witness can often contaminate memories. When witnesses confer about an event they can end up agreeing on an incorrect narrative. Research has found that 71% of witnesses changed their eyewitness accounts to include false components that their co-witnesses remembered. This makes it very difficult to reconstruct the actual account of an event. To prevent this effect, police should separate witnesses as early as possible before the reporting of the event. Unfortunately this is difficult, especially if the police do not get involved immediately after the event. Police should inform witnesses of the possibility of contamination as soon as possible. Witnesses should be interviewed as soon as possible with police noting if the witnesses have compared accounts. Once the accounts have been recorded, police should make notes of similarities or differences that could point to contaminated details or facts.

==== Confidence ====
A witness identifying a suspect can make a decision with little or great confidence. Level of confidence varies between different witnesses and situations. There are two types of confidence: confidence in a witness' own ability to make an identification (prior to viewing a police lineup) and confidence in having made an accurate identification or accurate rejection. It must be considered that memories are normally vulnerable to multiple influences and prone to distortions and deceptions: "they are never constant and never result in fully accurate representations [and] these changes occur without us being aware of them." As a consequence, the witness' confidence in his/her ability to make a correct identification should not be used to assess the accuracy of identification. Witnesses should be asked to attempt identifications even if their confidence is low. Confidence ratings after identification of a suspect is a better ( but not perfect) predictor.

In many experiments, witnesses are asked to rate their confidence in their decision after making an identification from a lineup. A number of psychologists have investigated factors that might affect the confidence accuracy relationship. In a recent review of 15 experiments, suspect identifications made with high confidence were, on average, 97 percent accurate. On the other hand, witnesses who report low confidence are highly suggestive of inaccurate identification. University of Virginia law professor Brandon Garrett analyzed trial materials for 161 DNA exonerated individuals and found that in 57 percent of those cases, it was possible to determine that, in the initial (uncontaminated) memory test, the eyewitnesses were, at best, uncertain.

The optimality hypothesis states that factors influencing the optimality of information processing also influence the reliability of the confidence estimate. During situations in which information processing conditions are less than optimal (e.g. the perpetrator is disguised or duration of exposure is brief) witnesses' performance during identification decreases and they are less confident in their decision. The confidence accuracy correlation is thus estimated to be stronger in situations of optimal information processing such as longer exposure time, and weaker under conditions that are not optimal.

Certain factors affect identification accuracy without influencing confidence whereas other factors influence confidence without having an effect on identification accuracy. Reconstructive processes in memory (i.e. the influence of post-event information on stored memories) can influence identification accuracy while not necessarily affecting confidence. Social influence processes (i.e. committing to a decision) might have an effect on confidence judgements while having little to no effect on the accuracy of the identification.

=== Interviews ===
The method of conducting an interview has great implication on the accuracy of the testimony. When the person being interviewed is forced to provide more information, he/she is more likely to engage in confabulation. For example, when participants were shown a video and instructed to answer all questions (answerable and unanswerable) about its content, they often fabricated information. When prodded too much to remember something, people often fall upon false memories. This effect is also seen in hypnosis: when people intensely try and are guided to remember something, they may end up mistaking a vivid imagination as a memory.

==== Cognitive interview technique ====
Researchers have developed a strategy, entitled the cognitive interview technique, to elicit the most accurate eyewitness memory. In this preferred protocol for conducting interviews, the interrogator should make the witness feel comfortable, ask open-ended questions, and grant the witness freedom in describing the event. In addition, the interviewer should encourage the witness to exhaust his/her memory by reinstating the context of the event, recalling the events in different orders, and viewing the event scene from different perspectives.

==== Suggestibility ====
Distortions in a witness's memory can be induced by suggestive questioning procedures. Asking eyewitnesses to repeatedly retrieve information in multiple interviews may enhance memory because the event is being rehearsed many times or, as in many cases, increase suggestibility. Misleading information offered by the investigators may attract more attention than the originally encoded information, so the witness' memory of the event is altered to include erroneous details suggested during the interview. In addition, repeating questions could make the witness feel pressured to change his or her answer or elaborate on an already-given response with fabricated details. Open-ended questioning can reduce the level of retrieval-enhanced suggestibility because the witness is not subjected to testing manipulation by the interviewer.

==== Contextual reinstatement ====
Contextual reinstatement is a common technique used to help eyewitnesses remember details about a specific environment—reviewing the initial environment in which the original information was encoded. Taking a witness back to the scene where the event occurred, for example, will help facilitate the accuracy in identifying perpetrators. Reinstatement is thought to improve recall as it provides memory retrieval cues. Research has demonstrated that pairing faces of suspects or words with contextual cues at the scene of the crime will enhance performance on recognition tasks. Therefore, it seems practical that these results can be applied to eyewitness identification. Methods commonly used to examine context reinstatement include photographs of the environment/scene, mental contextual reinstatement cues, and guided recollection. Studies show that re-exposing participants to the crime scene does enhance performance in facial recognition. There were also notable effects for context reinstatement where improvement on correct identifications while increasing false alarms. Reports also show that the magnitude of improvement via context reinstatement increased in lifelike situations compared to laboratory studies.

==== Experimental context ====
An alteration of context was found to be one of the most important predictors of recognition accuracy. Such changes in experimental context have been shown to have effects similar to transformations in appearance, such as disguises. Criminal identifications can be influenced by a change in context. Investigators must account for the fact that encountering an acquaintance that we usually see in one context, such as work place, alters memory generalizability when compared to encountering the same acquaintance in another environment that acts like an unassociated context, such as a grocery store. The changes in environment make it difficult to identify this acquaintance. Initially, the individual might seem familiar but because this person is not in the normal context, it might be difficult to place the face and recall the name. Researchers have begun to implement procedures for reinstating the context surrounding a specific event in an attempt to improve identification accuracy. Reinstating the crime scene is often not possible. Sometimes, however it is possible to have eyewitnesses imagine and thus mentally reinstate the surroundings with imagery instructions and other mnemonic devices. In some instances, objects from the crime scene such as guns or clothing can be used additionally to help reinstate the context. Such methods have successfully shown to improve reliability and accuracy of eyewitness recall.

==== Verbal overshadowing effect ====
The process of describing a face entails thinking about its features independently, but people process faces configurally (as a whole, encoding the features in relation to one another). So, the process of describing the face often impairs the memory of it—this is the verbal overshadowing effect. A verbal overshadowing effect typically refers to the negative effect on memory recall as a result of giving a verbal description of a visual object. For example, a witness who gives a verbal description of a face is likely to have subsequent impaired recognition for that face. However, Perfect et al. (2002) predicted that the verbal overshadowing effect would also be seen in voice recognition; that is that verbally describing a voice should also impair subsequent recognition of that voice. They predicted this because they argued that voices were difficult to articulate and so it is likely they would be vulnerable to the verbal overshadowing effect. This was found to be the case. Moreover, a dissociation between accuracy and confidence was observed. Participants' confidence that they had identified the correct voice in the audio-lineup was not influenced by the verbal overshadowing effect; in other words, verbal overshadowing had the effect of decreasing earwitnesses' recognition ability but without their knowledge.

== Child testimony ==
Most of the research on eyewitness memory has involved adults, despite the fact that it is not uncommon for children to have been involved in a crime or to have been the central witness of a crime. Statistics from the Crown Prosecution Service revealed that 1,116 children under the age of 10 were witnesses to a crime in England and Wales in 2008/9.

Children's testimony refers to when children are required to testify in court after witnessing or being involved in a crime. In situations where a child is the main witness of a crime, the result of the hearing is dependent on the child's memory of the event. And there are several important issues associated with eyewitness memory of children. For example, the accuracy of the child's explanation, in such situations, coupled with how well the child can identify the setting of the crime and the individuals involved in the crime, influence the credibility of the child's testimony. Whilst research shows that it is possible for children to provide relevant and accurate forensic information, they appear less reliable than adult witnesses and like all witnesses, can create false memories. The experience of testifying can also be harmful and anxiety-inducing to the child, leaving them unable to give a credible testimony.

Moreover, children often have a limited vocabulary, a desire to please the officer, or difficulty answering questions because of trauma. Using early childhood memories in eyewitness testimony can also be challenging because for the first 1–2 years of life, brain structures such as the limbic system, which holds the hippocampus and the amygdala and is involved in memory storage, are not yet fully developed. Research has demonstrated that children can remember events from before the age of 3–4 years, but that these memories decline as children get older (see childhood amnesia).

Children can be involved in testimony not only when they are witnesses, but also when they are victims. There have been several cases of children recovering false memories of childhood abuse. Children as especially suggestible and in cases of recovered memories, is hard to determine whether the recovered memory is accurate or imagined. Due to the sensitivity of these cases, strategic interviewing is implemented for children, which may result in the validity of the memory to suffer. Strategic interviewing must be assessed with sensitivity on an individual bases and without leading questions, as they may influence the child's answer. Additional influences may include individuals surrounding the child prior to, and during the hearing. If children hear new information from such individuals, studies show that children will more than likely agree with what the others said—regardless of the child's initial opinion.

Studies on children show that the average child is at greater risk for memory loss, due to the brain's immaturity and plasticity, when compared to an average adult but that as children age, they may make less memory errors and be less susceptible to suggestibility. Poorer memory performance in young kids was shown when youth of different ages were asked to recall a doctor's visit. Children aged 3–5 answered with much less accuracy than individuals aged 6–15, indicating developmental differences in memory capacity. Furthermore, it has been shown that information encoded and stored in memory is dependent on the extent of knowledge regarding the event. That is, children exposed to an event with little knowledge, their memory of the event will not be as accurate when compared to a child who is more knowledgeable on event-related topics. These results of increased sensitivity, suggestibility and memory loss in children lead one to question the competency of a child to serve as an eyewitness. Researchers have determined that children should be considered a competent witness when they have the capacity to observe, communicate, produce sufficient memories, differentiate truth from lies, and understand the obligation to tell the truth. However, the same caution that is taken with all eyewitnesses should be taken with child testimony, as all eyewitness testimonies are prone to inaccuracies.

== Intellectual ability and testimony ==
Individuals with intellectual disabilities are at a higher risk for sexual abuse and exploitation because they are often dependent on others and uneducated or physically incompetent in ways of self-protection. Therefore, much research has been devoted to investigating the accountability of these individuals in eyewitness testimonies. When a group of adults chosen by the Developmental Disabilities Association was compared to a control group of college students, they performed equally well when a target was absent from a lineup. However, the control group were better at recognizing when a target was present in a lineup, leading to the determination that people with intellectual disabilities are more suggestible and likely to confabulate. Children with intellectual disabilities show similar patterns in their eyewitness accounts. After watching a video of a crime, children with these disabilities performed worse than non-disabled kids of the same age on free recall, open-ended questions, and both general and specific misleading questions. These children performed better than the age-matched control group only on leading questions with yes or no answers, suggesting that they are more likely to acquiesce in the interview. These findings indicate that individuals with intellectual disabilities could be considered competent witnesses if interrogated in a non-leading manner.

== Eidetic memory ==
Individuals who are said to possess eidetic memories are thought to hold to an image in mind for longer and with more accuracy than the average individual. But evidence for eidetic memory is limited, and there is no evidence for photographic memory or a memory being an exact replica of an event. The memories of those who claim to have superior eidetic memories are just as flawed as the memories of individuals who have normal mnemonic abilities; people who claim to have photographic memories are not immune to flawed eyewitness testimony. Witnesses who believe that they are able to retrieve an accurate mental photograph will also be much more confident in their account of the event and may influence the trial outcome. Accuracy recall of such visual scenes is a controversial issue. In the past, eidetikers were believed to have extremely accurate recall for visual displays, but modern research findings might reveal a different story. Some research demonstrates that eidetic children have greater recall accuracy for visual details compared to non-eidetic children. Other researchers have failed to find any advantage between the two groups. It is also hypothesized that eidetic imagery is not exactly related to memory and improves recall for visual details. As such, photographic memory is not useful in the courtroom.

The frequency of eidetic imagery is low in adults and shows greatest frequency in early child development. In fact, it is almost non-existent past the age of 7. When procedures are used to classify eidetic memory separate from the characteristic of afterimage and memory image, a small number of children are classified as true eidetikers. These children are still suggestible; their eyewitness testimonies may still have error.

== Earwitness memory ==
Research investigating earwitness memory has only recently emerged from the shadow of the extensively investigated phenomena of eyewitness memory and eyewitness testimony, despite having been in use within the English justice system since the 1660s. Earwitness memory refers to a person's auditory memory for a crime or incriminatory information they have heard. Much of the research which has been conducted on earwitness memory focuses on speaker recognition, otherwise known as voice recognition, whilst there is less research which investigates memory for environmental sounds. The majority of the literature on voice and face recognition finds a robust face advantage; compared to voice recognition, face recognition appears to be the stronger pathway, with most individuals finding it much more difficult to recall a voice compared to recalling a face.

=== Eyewitness vs. earwitness accuracy ===
A substantial proportion of the literature into witness testimony finds a robust recall advantage for visual stimuli compared to auditory stimuli. We seem to have a profound memory advantage for visual objects and scenes whilst being poorer at remembering auditory information. This therefore has clear implications for eyewitness and earwitness memory; what is seen should be more likely to be remembered than what is heard by a witness. This finding can be extended to faces and voices; within the person recognition literature, it has been found that individuals are far better at identifying a person by their face as opposed to their voice.

=== Non-verbal memory: environmental sound ===
Researchers define environmental sounds as those that are either animate, inanimate, artificial or natural; sounds produced by real events as opposed to machine-generated sounds; sounds that are more complex than laboratory-produced sounds and those that are dynamic and convey a sense of activity. Examples include the ring of a doorbell, coughing, rain, a car engine, a railroad crossing signal, and so on. Such environmental sounds are important sources of information and provide us with knowledge of our surroundings.

Research has found that recall for environmental sounds can be dependent upon the storage and retrieval of verbalizable interpretations. In one study, individuals heard a selection of ambiguous environmental sounds and attempted to label each sound as they were presented. A week later, individuals labelled the sounds again and it was found that re-labelling the sounds subsequently caused individuals to perform much better in the recognition test. Recognition of environmental sounds therefore appears dependent upon labeling both at input and in the test phase, either when labels are created by subjects as they hear the sounds, or when labels are generated by the experimenter and presented to subjects. More recent research has found that it is possible to memorize the loudness of an environmental sound. However, a lot of research investigating environmental sound and memory recall is conducted in a laboratory setting and so has limited ecological validity and generalizability.

=== Verbal memory: voice recognition ===
Compared to memory recall for faces, voice recall appears to be significantly more vulnerable to interference. These consistent findings suggest that earwitness memory is far more vulnerable to the effects of interference compared to eyewitness memory; although the weight placed on eyewitness memory in court should also be carefully considered as there is much evidence to suggest its fallibility. For example, some studies have found that eyewitness identification can be impaired by effects such as the weapon focus effect or verbal overshadowing. Nevertheless, voice recognition appears to be the pathway most significantly impaired by interfering factors.

==== Face overshadowing effect ====
A face overshadowing effect is often found to occur, whereby individuals' voice recognition performance is impaired with the co-presentation of a face. Visual information therefore appears to have the ability to significantly interfere with the recall of auditory information. However, research has investigated whether earwitness memory is impaired to the same extent when the face of the one speaking is concealed in some way. Research shows that when a face is covered, with a balaclava for instance, accuracy for voice identification slightly improves; however a face overshadowing effect still exists despite the earwitness being able to see fewer facial features.

==== Pitch of voice ====
Voice pitch has also been identified as a factor that can affect voice recognition performance. Individuals are likely to exaggerate their memory for pitch; upon hearing a high pitched voice in an initial presentation (such as the perpetrator's voice in a crime), individuals are likely to choose an even higher-pitched voice in the test phase (audio line-up). Similarly, upon hearing a low-pitched voice, they are likely to remember the voice as being even lower in pitch when voices are presented in an audio line-up. Comparable cognitive functions seem to operate when individuals attempt to remember faces; ambiguity surrounding the ethnicity or gender of faces is likely to result in the individual's recall of faces to be exaggerated with regards to ethnic and gender-related features. Researchers call this the accentuation effect. It is suggested that voice pitch, alongside other 'surface properties' of speech such as speech content, are instantaneously encoded into memory. This contrasts with auditory features such as amplitude and speaking rate, of which there is contrary evidence about whether they are automatically encoded into memory.

==== Other-accent effect ====
There is evidence to suggest that witnesses may find it harder to identify a perpetrator's voice if the perpetrator speaks the witness's native language with an accent compared to without one. It is thought that more cognitive effort is required to process a non-native speaker's voice. This is because a 'cost' is placed on the listener, with accented voices violating the 'speech schema' the listener is familiar with in their own geographic region. Therefore, listeners may be required to expend more effort in order to recognize and distinguish the non-native speaker's phonetic segments and words.

An accent also has the potential to interfere with the witness's ability to recognize the perpetrator's appearance. It has been found that when witnesses are asked to recall a perpetrator, the perpetrator's physical appearance is remembered less well when they have an accent compared to when they do not. This appears the case with different accents, speech content and how long a listener is exposed to the speaker. One proposed explanation for why accents can negatively affect the recall of visual information and eyewitness memory draws from Wickens' (2002; 2008) multiple resource theory. Wickens' theory suggests that attentional resources are separated into distinct 'pools'. Only visual and auditory tasks have access to visual and auditory attentional resources, respectively. However, when a task arises which requires the use of attentional resources from both modalities, this leads to competition for resources, in turn leading the inability to accomplish one or both tasks or resulting in poorer performance. Therefore, fewer general resources may have been available in order to encode and remember the perpetrator's appearance after witnesses had used attentional resources for the processing of the accented voice and speech content.

==== Direct hearing vs. devices ====
Whilst many earwitness accounts are attained directly and 'in-the-moment', many will be acquired over a telephone or over other communication devices. Whether the earwitness hears a conversation or other auditory information in person or hears it over a communication device could impact their rate of accuracy. However, contrary to this prediction, research has found no significant differences between the accuracy of voice identification when the voice was heard directly or over a mobile phone, despite the sound quality seeming poorer in the latter.

==== Emotion ====
Researchers have also investigated to what extent the distinctiveness of a voice, such as heightened emotion, can aid or impair an individual's recollection of it. There is evidence that faces are better remembered if they display emotion compared to when they appear neutral; in one study healthy control participants remembered more accurately happy faces than they did neutral faces. Likewise, a host of studies have found that memories that are more emotional in nature are more complex and are less likely to be forgotten compared to memories that are more neutral. It therefore seems logical for researchers to explore whether auditory material which is emotional in nature is also remembered better. Research has produced conflicting results. Bradley and Lang (2000) found that there was a memory advantage for auditory material when it was more emotional compared to when it was more neutral. The authors also found that participants' physiological activity when they listened to emotionally arousing sounds was very similar to the physiological arousal produced when they were shown emotional images. However, studies investigating emotion in voices have found no significant differences between recall rates for emotional voices and neutral voices, with some research even demonstrating that emotion can impair memory recall for the voice. For instance, it was found that angry voices were recalled to a lesser extent compared to if they were neutral in tone. This finding has been supported by other studies which have also found that rather than enhancing voice identification, emotion may significantly interfere with it. However, ethical guidelines will confine the levels of emotionality that are appropriate to be induced in participants in a laboratory study environment.

==== Time-delay ====
The amount of time between when an individual hears incriminatory information or the voice of their perpetrator, for instance, and the time they are required to recall the auditory information as an earwitness can affect their recall accuracy rate. Memory for auditory information including voice recognition appears to decline over time; studies have found that participants can recall more correct auditory information immediately after the initial presentation than after a four-day time interval, supporting several other studies finding similar results. Furthermore, the extent to which the time-interval affects memory recall for auditory information depends upon whether the witness just heard the auditory information of whether it was accompanied by visual information too, such as the face of the perpetrator. One study has found that recall is enhanced when both auditory information is heard and visual information is seen, as opposed to just hearing auditory information. Still, when individuals are asked to remember the voice and the speech content, they are only likely to have remembered the gist of what has been said as opposed to remembering verbatim. This clearly has implications for the amount of weight that is placed upon earwitness testimony in court. Earwitnesses are not typically required to give statements or recall a voice or auditory information immediately after an event has occurred, but instead are required to recall information after a time-delay. This could significantly impair the accuracy of their recall. The testimonies of those who have only heard the voice of a suspect compared to a witness who has both seen the face and heard the voice of a suspect should also be treated with extreme caution in court.

=== Children's earwitness memory ===
It is of critical importance that research into children's earwitness memory is also conducted in order to secure justice for child victims and witnesses. Compared to adult earwitness memory, the area of child earwitness memory has been largely neglected. In one of few studies comparing adult and child earwitnesses, Öhman, Eriksson & Granhag (2011) found that only children in the older age-group of 11–13 years performed at above chance levels for voice recognition, compared to the younger-age group of children (aged 7–9) and adults. They suggest that under the age of 10 a child may be overwhelmed by the cognitive demands of the task and so do not perform above chance levels on the task. Meanwhile, adults made the highest percentage (55%) of false identifications. They also found that voice pitch level and speaker rate was highly correlated with children's but not adults' false identification rates. Overall however, the results confirmed other studies which have also shown that in general, earwitness performance for unfamiliar voices is poor.

Other research found that children aged 11 to 13 years old who were tested very shortly after exposure to a voice made more correct identifications compared with children who were tested after a time interval of two weeks. This was found not to be the case for adult witnesses.

=== Auditory memory in blind individuals ===
It has been suggested that blind individuals have an enhanced ability to hear and recall auditory information in order to compensate for a lack of vision. However, whilst blind adults' neural systems demonstrate heightened excitability and activity compared to sighted adults, it is still not exactly clear to what extent this compensatory hypothesis is accurate. Nevertheless, many studies have found that there appears to be a high activation of certain visual brain areas in blind individuals when they perform non-visual tasks. This suggests that in blind individuals' brains, a reorganization of what are normally visual areas has occurred in order for them to process non-visual input. This supports a compensatory hypothesis in the blind.

=== Enhancement ===
Research has investigated how to improve the accuracy of earwitness performance. One study investigated whether an interview called a Cognitive Interview would improve adult or child (11–13 years) voice recognition performance or speech content recall if it was administered immediately after the event. It was predicted that a cognitive interview would improve the likelihood of witnesses making a correct identification and improve recall of speech content, whether immediately after the event of after a time-delay and regardless of age. It was also predicted that adults would recall more content than children, because other studies have indicated that children provide less detail than adults during free recall. However, results revealed poor correct identification rates, regardless of the type of interview earwitnesses had received (19.8%), as well as high false identification rates; 38.7% of participants incorrectly identified an innocent suspect. It did not seem to matter if an interview had been conducted shortly after the event or not. Moreover, there did not seem to be any difference between children and adults in terms of the number of suspects they correctly identified by their voice. Many researchers would suggest that this furthers the case for children (aged 11–13) to be thought of as equally capable of proving potentially helpful earwitness accounts within court settings.

== Example ==
In 1984, Jennifer Thompson-Cannino selected Ronald Cotton from both a photographic line-up and later a physical line-up as her rapist, leading to his conviction of rape and burglary and a sentence of life in prison plus fifty-four years. Ronald Cotton spent eleven years in prison due to faulty eyewitness memory before DNA evidence exonerated him in 1995. Despite Jennifer's strong intent to study her rapist's features during the traumatic event for the purpose of identifying him afterward, she fell victim to encoding limitations at the time of the assault. Jennifer undoubtedly experienced a great degree of stress on the night of her assault with a knife pressed to her neck and a feeling of absolute powerlessness. "There in my memory, at the knife-edge of fear, time distorted". She also fell prey to factors after the incident that affected the accuracy of her recall. Even if memories are correctly encoded at the time of the event, interference and decay can alter these memories in negative ways. The simple passage of time entails memory loss, and any new information presented between the time of the crime and testimony can interfere with a witness's recall. When Jennifer was asked to identify her perpetrator from a series of photographs, she was told by officers that she should not feel compelled to make an identification. However, Jennifer's faith in the legal system led her to believe that the police must have had a suspect to warrant her participation in photographic identification. And when Jennifer selected the photo of Ronald, the police told her she did great. The photograph of Jennifer's true rapist, Bobby Poole, was not included in the lineup. The positive feedback Jennifer received allowed her to begin incorporating details from the photograph into her memory of the attack. The fact that Jennifer took five minutes to study the pictures before she selected Ronald Cotton's photo also allowed Jennifer ample opportunity to encode Ronald's face as her assailant and thereby interfere with her original memory.

The photographs were presented simultaneously, allowing Jennifer to compare the photographs to each other as opposed to her memory of the event. As a result, when she was later asked to choose her assailant from a physical line-up, Jennifer saw Ronald in her memory and thus chose him. The police further solidified her choice by telling her "We thought that might be the guy…it's the same person you picked from the photos.". As a result, the authorities viewed Jennifer as the ideal eyewitness, one who was motivated to remember the face of her assailant during the event and subsequently confident in her identification of the target. Unfortunately, the level of confidence in an eyewitness' recall is not associated with accuracy of identification. The eyewitness' confidence in his or her recall is, however, strongly associated with the jury's belief in the accuracy of the eyewitness' testimony, thus increasing the risk of assigning guilty verdicts to innocent individuals. Unconscious transference essentially contaminated Jennifer's memory. Even after Jennifer learned of Ronald's innocence, she still saw his face in her memory of the attack years later. It wasn't until she met with Ronald face-to-face and he gave her his forgiveness did she begin to see Ronald for himself rather than as her assailant, thus beginning a remarkable and unexpected friendship.
