= Weapon focus =

Eyewitness memory bias

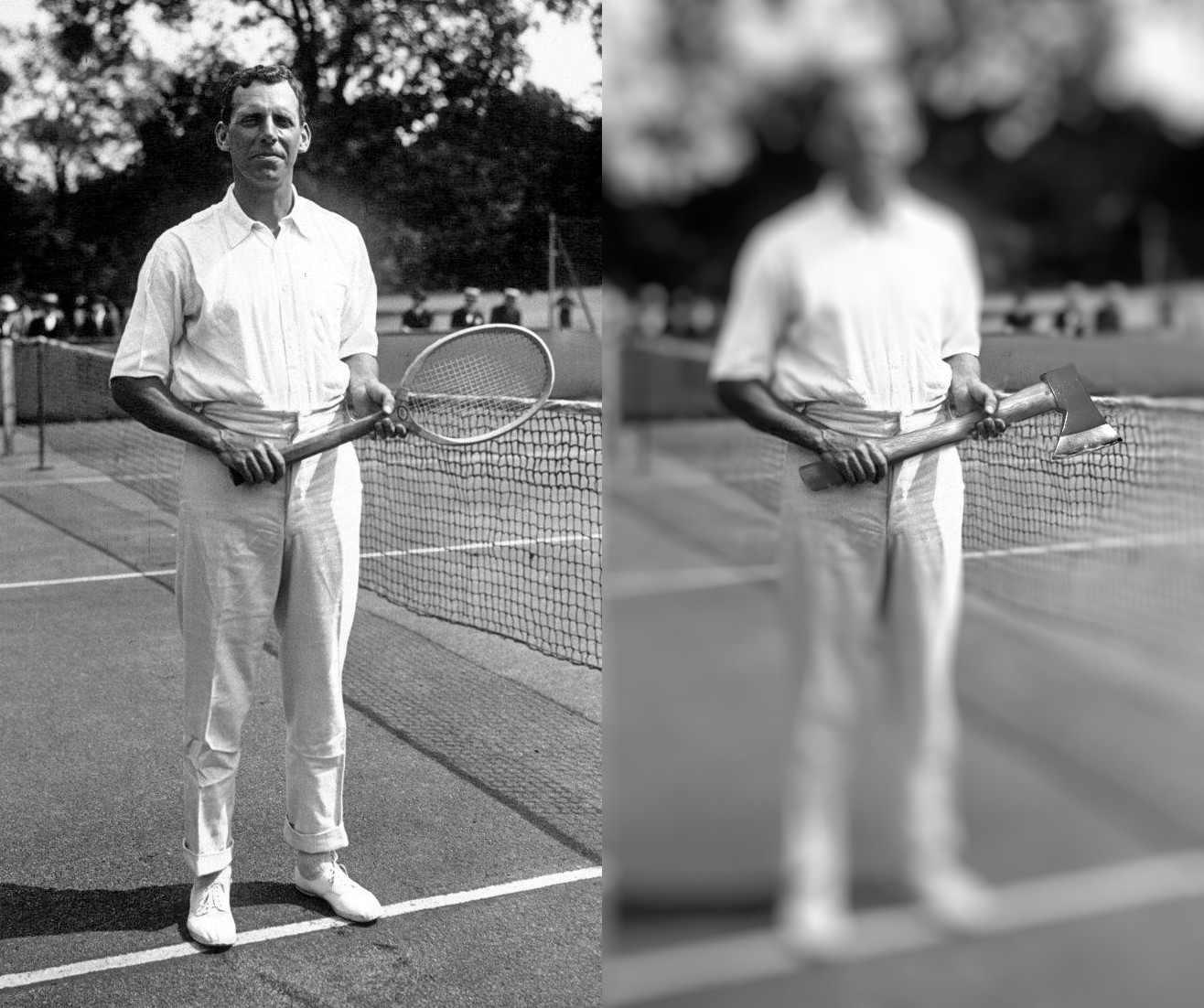
A person carrying an expected object for a particular context (a tennis racquet on a tennis court, left) leads to no particular focus of attention from the viewer. A person carrying an unexpected and threatening object (a hatchet, right) leads the viewer to focus more on that object.

Weapon focus is the concentration on a weapon by a witness of a crime and the subsequent inability to accurately remember other details of the crime. Weapon focus is a factor that heavily affects the reliability of eyewitness testimony. This effect involves a witness to a crime diverting their attention to the weapon the perpetrator is holding, thus causing memory impairments and leaving less attention for other details in the scene, such as the attacker's face, clothing or vehicle.

Several studies support the notion of weapon focus, particularly in terms of greater attention paid to the weapon and its effects on recognition and recall. Elizabeth Loftus, Yuille and Burns have all been associated with studies showing the existence of a weapon focus effect.

== Background information ==
In the field of forensic psychology, researchers have validated the weapon focus effect and shown that a witness will remember less about a crime, or the perpetrator of a crime, when a weapon is present, as opposed to if the weapon is not present at an identical crime. As for the reason of the phenomenon, the two leading explanations attribute it to the cognitive arousal of the witness, or to the overall unusualness of the situation.

In one of the earliest known investigations of weapon focus, Johnson and Scott (1976) had two groups of participants come into what they thought was a laboratory study of human memory. In actuality, they were to take part in a simulated interaction intended to determine whether the presence of a weapon would influence eyewitness memory for an event. Participants in the control condition sat in a waiting room where they overheard a conversation between two people following which a man exited with greasy hands and a grease pen. In the weapon condition, participants sat in the same waiting room, but instead they heard a violent argument – including furniture being thrown around – following which a man came out holding a blood-stained knife. During a photo line-up, the control participants were more likely to accurately identify the man they saw in the waiting room relative to participants in the weapon condition (49% versus 33% correct identifications).

In 1979, initially Loftus postulated that it is an expected occurrence in the event where an individual is highly aroused, such as in the case of a frightening situation. This suggestion was criticized for its lack of supporting evidence, so its author conducted several studies in 1987 and finally demonstrated the viability of weapon focus. The study conducted by Johnson and Scott (1976) represents one of the few early simulation studies available, likely due to the ethical issues surrounding the exposure of research participants to a putatively threatening scenario. For this reason much of the research conducted on the weapon focus effect has made use of videos or slideshows. In one of the first such experiments, Loftus, Loftus and Messo (1987) had participants watch a video in which a young man approached the counter of a fast food restaurant, presented an object to the cashier, accepted money and left. In the control condition the man presented a cheque to the cashier whereas in the weapon condition the man presented a gun. Specialized equipment tracked the participant's gaze as they viewed the video to determine with what frequency (and for how long) they fixated upon the item of interest (the cheque or the gun). Relative to the control condition, participants in the weapon condition looked at the item the man was holding more frequently and for greater duration. Further, when tested for the details of the event, performance was better for the control condition relative to the weapon condition - with the exception that participants in the weapon condition were more likely to recall what object the man was holding (a gun).

Another significant challenge to the studies on the weapon focus effect has been their ecological validity. Specifically, many theorists have argued that the effect is limited to the laboratory design. These claims have been supported by the relative absence of applied evidence supporting the effect. Several reports have been published looking for evidence of a weapon focus effect using records of actual crimes. According to the laboratory findings summarized above, the prediction had been that eyewitness memory would be worse for weapon crimes compared to non-weapon crimes. Many primary studies have failed to support this prediction. Even so, a recent meta-analysis conducted by Fawcett et al. (2013) has demonstrated that when the data for all of the applied studies are combined, there is a small but reliable effect suggesting that weapon presence impairs actual eyewitness memory. This is extremely significant when one considers how jurors tend to overvalue eyewitness testimony. This finding adds to the ecological validity of the laboratory studies conducted on this topic. One reason why this effect's ecological validity may be hard to support could be the difficulty in testing this effect on actual eyewitnesses and their memory of a crime.

On the other hand, a study published in 2004 found the opposite when confronted with weapon focus. It found that the exposure to firearms was associated with significantly better eyewitness descriptions especially regarding basic features such as gender, height, build, age, and ethnicity.

== Causes of weapon focus ==
A leading explanation for a cause of weapon focus is the unusualness of the situation, being a witness to a crime. Since the initial research conducted by Johnson and Scott (1976) and Loftus et al. (1987), others have demonstrated a similar effect using unusual objects rather than weapons. These findings are described as the "Unusual Item Hypothesis." This effect is seen when an object does not fit with the schema of the situation. Attention is then drawn to the out-of-place object and less attention is paid to other objects in the scene making recalling these other objects more difficult. This effect was observed in Toronto in 1997 when a robber entered a coffee shop and demanded money while threatening to strangle a goose he was holding if he did not receive the money. Meanwhile, the customers were too focused on the strangeness of a goose in the coffee shop to observe any details about the perpetrator himself. This effect has also been observed in the lab. For example, Pickel (1998) demonstrated an effect comparable to weapon focus using a video in which a man approached a cashier and presented a whole raw chicken or miniature Pillsbury Dough Boy instead of an expected item such as a wallet. From her finding, Pickel (1998) argued that the weapon focus arose from the unusual nature of the object in the relation to the context in which it was presented. Another study by Mansour et al. (2018) presented subjects with a video of a crime scene. From their findings, subjects remembered more about a scene when a crime was committed with a binder, which represented an ordinary object, compared to unusual objects such as a gun or knife. This was also seen in a study done in 2013 which examined weapon focus, and determined whether or not a gun automatically engages visual attention. There were two experiments that were conducted, which included targets that either depicted a gun, or another object. The conclusion of this experiment was that images of a gun did not engage attention more than that of images of other objects, including a tomato and a pocket watch. It was discovered that in order for an object to be viewed as threatening, the environment and context of the situation is of utmost importance. The context of the situation will ultimately determine whether or not weapon focus is existent in an instance of eyewitness testimony. Furthermore, in her article, Kerri L. Pickel determined that the peculiarity of an object is a reason for the weapon focus effect. Being unusual attracts more attention to the weapon, but the object does not necessarily have to be a weapon to produce this effect. This contributes to the idea that the context of the situation has more importance than the actual weapon a victim witnesses. The mere unusual aspect of a situation with a foreign object is enough to elicit the weapon focus response.

In their 2013 meta-analysis, Fawcett et al. (2013) presented the issues surrounding the arousal/threat hypothesis. This is one of the oldest explanations connected to the weapon focus phenomenon, and relies on the Yerkes-Dodson law that links arousal and performance; emotionally arousing states, such as stress, can enhance performance up to a point, but after this there are detrimental impacts on cognitive functions, like memory and learning. The amygdala, a brain region located near the center of the brain, is responsible for fear processing and emotional response to both negative and positive stimuli. Research by Sander and Grafman has suggested that the amygdala serves to not only process fear-inducing stimuli but also to determine which information is relevant for encoding. This suggests that the amygdala plays a role in determining what to pay attention to during the crime. In situations where a weapon is present, witnesses tend to focus on the object of arousal and miss peripheral details, like the identity of the perpetrator. This explanation relies on Easterbrook's (1959) theory that stress causes a reduction in mental resources, thus the range of cues a subject can attend to in this situation will be significantly reduced. In a dangerous situation where a weapon is present, survival becomes the most important facets and peripheral information is overlooked. This means that the witness has a heightened memory for the weapon, but may struggle to recall other information. Over time, research into the role of anxiety on weapon focus has produced inconsistent findings, causing researchers to look at alternative causes of the phenomenon. The relative contributions of both arousal and unusualness remain one of the primary theoretical issues in this literature, with some authors arguing for a contribution of both.

Another potential cause of weapon focus is the "automatic capture" explanation. This suggests that the attention paid to a weapon is automatic and unintentional. Studies have been performed that show that even if a subject is asked to ignore specific stimuli they are unable to, thus indicating an automatic response. Remington et al. (1992) conclude that a participant might intend to ignore an event, but their attention is often automatically captured by it - as such, an eyewitness may not intend to solely focus on a weapon, but if their diversion of attention to it cannot be controlled, they possess little ability to ignore it. Yantis and Jonides (1996) suggest that it makes adaptive sense for humans to divert attention towards new objects, as a new representation has to be created for that object, presenting another explanation for the weapon focus phenomenon. However, they also conclude that attention focus is not automatic and can be directed on command, especially if attention is already focused somewhere specific. If attention is already focused away from a certain stimulus, then automatic capture is avoidable.

== Differences in weapon focus effects ==
Differences in eyewitness memory can be attributed to whether the perpetrator holding a weapon is consistent with the eyewitness's schema. People use schemas to organize knowledge and provide a basis for future understanding. Researcher Kerri Pickel posits that if the object held by the target falls in line with the witness's schema, they will not divert as much attention to it and the characteristics of the perpetrator will be encoded normally - it is only when the combination of the perpetrator and the object is not consistent with the schema that the weapon focus effect will be significant in distorting memory.

Pickel looked into some differences in the memory of the eyewitnesses, when the physical traits of the perpetrator change. Firstly, the difference in memory was examined between eyewitnesses that saw a white perpetrator versus a black perpetrator. Her research, conducted in 2009, showed that the weapon focus effect weakens with 'black' perpetrators in comparison to 'white' perpetrators, and that the weapon focus effect is not significant when a "Black perpetrator wore a style of clothing that is strongly associated with Black men". It is suggested that individuals who observe a black perpetrator who is armed automatically activates a stereotype that links black men with weapons and crime. As a consequence, this reduces the unusualness of the weapon and increases the likelihood of attracting attention.

In the same year, Pickel also looked at the weapon focus effect on memory for female versus male perpetrators. The experiments involved participants watching videos that either had a male or female perpetrator, holding either a gun or a neutral object. Overall, the weapon focus effect was strongest when the gun was held by a woman as opposed to a male perpetrator. Participants rated the presence of the gun as more unusual when it was held by a woman versus when it was held by a man, less accurately described the physical traits of the perpetrator when they were holding a gun and the overall memory falsities were greater in the conditions where the gun was held by a female. The presence of the gun in the possession of the female perpetrators was more unexpected, thus participants allocated more of their attention to the weapon over their physical traits. Pickel did, however, find that the weapon focus effect was mitigated when participants were primed and the perpetrators were categorized as dangerous and aggressive.

A different effect of weapon focus can be used in a way to reduce change blindness. A study in 2017 aimed to find a way to reduce change blindness by making use of weapon focus. What they found was that the group of subjects that make use of weapon focus was less susceptible to change blindness when the change in the picture was a weapon they focused on. This shows that weapon focus can be used in a less negative way.

== Weapon focus effect on children ==
In light of research recommendations, some more recent research has looked into the individual differences surrounding the weapon focus phenomenon, where not all samples of participants have reacted in the same way to the presence of a weapon, namely children. In some situations, like domestic violence, children can be crucial eyewitnesses, so recent research has looked at the age at which the weapon focus effect becomes influential. One study looked at the impacts of a surprising object on the memory of children, using a syringe filled with red dye in place of a classic weapon. The presence of the syringe caused a reduction in performance on a memory task, suggesting that the children diverted a significant proportion of their attention to the weapon, so that their recall ability was negatively impacted. This implies that the weapon focus effect does not exclusively occur in adults. At a similar time, Pickel et al. (2008) conducted comparable research, which used videos containing either a weapon or neutral object. Again, children recalled significantly less accurate information when a knife was involved as opposed to a water bottle. The researchers attributed this to the unexpected nature of the knife and schema violation. Adults were found to be more accurate in general with their recollection of the perpetrator than children; language abilities, appreciation for the situation and differing locations were all implicated in these asymmetries.

== Reducing weapon focus and its impact on criminal cases ==
Pickel, Ross, and Truelove (2006) decided to take a more in depth look at these ideas and apply them specifically to reducing weapon focus. If weapon focus is an automatic process, then the capture of attention may be out of an eyewitness' control. However, if there is no automatic capture of the witness' attention, then weapon focus effect may be able to be overcome. Specific training can be developed to teach a person who may be at risk of an armed robbery, such as a bank teller or cashier, to perform an identification that is comparable to if there was no weapon present. The data indicate that weapons do not capture attention automatically and involuntarily. If a witness was given a lecture about weapon focus and the problems that can arise in memory formation in an incident when a weapon is present at the scene, they can more accurately identify a perpetrator of a crime. This shows that with proper training weapon focus effect can be overcome and an eyewitness' testimony becomes more accurate. These findings, however, are theoretical and need to be replicated in real world situations to really assess the usefulness of them. They show great promise that weapon focus effect and be counteracted by education on the topic, but they will remain theoretical until further research and implementation of the idea can be conducted. Later research by Pickel and Sneyd (2018) showed that subjects reported more correct details of a crime scene if the perpetrator was White compared to a Black perpetrator. Stereotypes regarding race where measured in the study and concluded that memory performance was not related to subject prejudices. Ratings showed that the subjects had a high awareness of stereotypes, and had a low endorsement of prejudices. The findings imply that the presence of a weapon may make it more difficult for law enforcement to bring White offenders over Black offenders to justice.

One method that has become more and more prevalent to reduce negative consequences that can stem from errors in eyewitness testimony, including errors that can arise from weapon focus effect, is expert witness testimonies by research psychologists about eyewitness testimony. This is an educational session, which a judge has to allow, given by a forensic psychologist to a jury as part of the trial. This form of expert testimony has been called social framework testimony, defined by Cronin as "expert testimony that presents conclusions based on social science research to assist the court in making a decision." The expert testimony would provide the jury with a context for evaluating eyewitness testimonies and the jury is meant to factor that into its decision making process. These educational sessions in the courtroom will help make the presentation of eyewitness testimony as rigorous as possible and put as much scrutiny on the social evidence as what is put on physical, scientific evidence. Eyewitness testimony is very often wrong, and the scrutiny put on it greatly reduces the number of false convictions. Another way eyewitness testimony can be impaired even more by weapon focus is if the person in question is intoxicated. A study conducted in 2020 was done to observe what would happen if a person that was witnessing a crime was intoxicated and how it would affect their ability to retrieve crime scene data. The study found that if a person was intoxicated, they were more likely to focus on the weapon than people who weren't intoxicated. This should be taken into consideration when retrieving information from people in the incident and will help to get better eyewitness testimony.

The major problem with this strategy is that many judges do not allow this expert testimony in their courts. For example, in the court case Blasdell v. State (2010, 2015) a woman who had been robbed at gunpoint by an unknown man was able to describe the gun in great detail but could only provide very imprecise details of the perpetrator. The defense was unable to present expert testimony on the concept of weapon focus and the suspect was convicted based on the eyewitness testimony. Despite cases like these, judges' reasoning behind their not permitting expert testimony is usually that they think what the social framework testimony will present is common knowledge. However, the data overwhelmingly shows that the typical jury member does not know most of the information presented by the expert. The fallibility of eyewitness testimony is not common knowledge and eyewitness psychology can offer valid and constructive information to juries. Even with this knowledge, jury decisions cannot perfectly serve justice without exceptions, but perfection in the legal system is an unattainable goal. However, any information that can be presented about the shortcomings of eyewitness testimony can better serve justice in the long run. According to a 2001 survey of experts on eyewitness testimony, 87% found the weapon focus effect to be sufficiently reliable to form the basis of expert testimony in criminal trials. Regarding eyewitness testimony, another study by Shaw and Skolnick (1994) discovered that sex plays a role in eyewitness memory and recall of a crime. Both men and women identified targets of their own sex more easily than target persons of the opposite sex. Women identified other women more accurately and men identified men more accurately than the women did.

There can be some ethical concerns to these expert witnesses. There are arguments that suggest that these social framework testimonies discredit the eyewitnesses and put the victims and bystanders on trial. This is not the purpose of the experts though. These testimonies are merely attempting to educate jury members of problems that can arise from eyewitnesses. There can also be issues raised about the credibility of the expert testimonies. The screening process of the experts is not very stringent and the criteria of an expert witness are not laid out in black in white. This can lead to a battle of the experts between prosecution and defense. Any testimony the prosecution or defense deems relevant to contradict the opposing side may be introduced if the judge allows it, so an expert can be called and a battle of the experts can ensue. This takes away from the central point of a trial and can overwhelm the jury.

== See also ==
- Emotion and memory
- Eyewitness memory
