= Eyewitness identification =

Identification by a person who witnessed an event

In eyewitness identification, in criminal law, evidence is received from a witness "who has actually seen an event and can so testify in court". Eyewitness testimony is often seen by jurors as the most compelling type of evidence. Because eyewitness testimony can be unreliable, courts have many ways of attempting to ensure its truthfulness, including cross-examination by opposing counsel, line-up requirements, jury instructions, and expert testimony to inform jurors of the potential risks of eyewitness testimony.

Nonetheless, the Innocence Project states that "Eyewitness misidentification is the single greatest cause of wrongful convictions nationwide, playing a role in more than 75% of convictions overturned through DNA testing." This non-profit organization uses DNA evidence to reopen criminal convictions that were made before DNA testing was available as a tool in criminal investigations.

Even before DNA testing revealed wrongful convictions based on eyewitness identifications, courts recognized and discussed the limits of eyewitness testimony. The late U.S. Supreme Court Justice William J. Brennan, Jr. observed in 1980 that "At least since United States v. Wade, 388 U.S. 218 (1967), the Court has recognized the inherently suspect qualities of eyewitness identification evidence, and described the evidence as "notoriously unreliable", while noting that juries were highly receptive to it. Similarly, in the United Kingdom, the Criminal Law Review Committee, writing in 1971, stated that cases of mistaken identification "constitute by far the greatest cause of actual or possible wrong convictions".

Brennan said that "All the evidence points rather strikingly to the conclusion that there is almost nothing more convincing [to a jury] than a live human being who takes the stand, points a finger at the defendant, and says 'That's the one!'" Another commentator observed that the eyewitness identification of a person as a perpetrator was persuasive to jurors even when "far outweighed by evidence of innocence."

== Laws on eyewitness evidence in criminal cases ==
=== United States ===
The legal standards addressing the treatment of eyewitness testimony as evidence in criminal trials vary widely across the United States on issues ranging from the admissibility of eyewitness testimony as evidence, the admissibility and scope of expert testimony on the factors affecting its reliability, and the propriety of jury instructions on the same factors. In New Jersey, generally considered a leading court with respect to criminal law, a report was prepared by a special master during a remand proceeding in the case of New Jersey v. Henderson which comprehensively researched published literature and heard expert testimony with respect to eyewitness identification. Based on the master's report the New Jersey court issued a decision on August 22, 2011 which requires closer examination of the reliability of eyewitness testimony by trial courts in New Jersey. Perry v. New Hampshire, a case which raised similar issues, was decided January 11, 2012 by the U.S. Supreme Court. which in an 8–1 decision decided that judicial examination of eye-witness testimony was required only in the case of police misconduct.

Held: The Due Process Clause does not require a preliminary judicial inquiry into the reliability of an eyewitness identification when the identification was not procured under unnecessarily suggestive circumstances arranged by law enforcement.

The preeminent role of the jury in evaluating questionable evidence was cited by the court.

Detectives interrogating children in the court perhaps lack the necessary training to make them effective perhaps “ more work needs to be done in finding effective ways of helping appropriate members of the legal profession to develop skills and understanding in child development and in talking with children”

==== Admissibility ====
The federal due process standard governing the admissibility of eyewitness evidence is set forth in the U.S. Supreme Court case of Manson v. Brathwaite. Under the federal standard, if an identification procedure is shown to be unnecessarily suggestive, the court must consider whether certain independent indicia of reliability are present, and if so, weigh those factors against the corrupting effect of the flawed police procedure. Within that framework, the court should determine whether, under the totality of the circumstances, the identification appears to be reliable. If not, the identification evidence must be excluded from evidence under controlling federal precedent.

Certain criticisms have been waged against the Manson standard, however. According to legal scholars, "the rule of decision set out in Manson has failed to meet the Court's objective of furthering fairness and reliability." For example, the Court requires that the confidence of the witness be considered as an indicator of the reliability of the identification evidence. As noted above, however, extensive studies in the social sciences have shown that confidence is unreliable as a predictor of accuracy. Social scientists and legal scholars have also expressed concern that "the [Manson] list as a whole is substantially incomplete," thereby opening the courthouse doors to the admission of unreliable evidence.

==== Expert testimony ====
Expert testimony on the factors affecting the reliability of eyewitness evidence is allowed in some U.S. jurisdictions, and not in others. In most states, it is left to the discretion of the trial court judge. States generally allowing it include California, Arizona, Colorado, Hawaii, Tennessee (by a 2007 state Supreme Court decision), Ohio, and Kentucky. States generally prohibiting it include Pennsylvania and Missouri. Many states have less clear guidelines under appellate court precedent, such as Mississippi, New York, New Hampshire, and New Jersey. It is often difficult to tell whether expert testimony has been allowed in a given state, since if the trial court lets the expert testify, there is generally no record created. On the other hand, if the expert is not allowed, that becomes a ground of appeal if the defendant is convicted. That means that most cases that generate appellate records are cases only in which the expert was disallowed (and the defendant was convicted).

In those states where expert testimony on eyewitness reliability is not allowed, it is typically on grounds that the various factors are within the common sense of the average juror, and thus not the proper topic of expert testimony. To further expand jurors are " likely to put faith in the expert's testimony or even to overestimate the significance of results that the expert reports"

Polling data and other surveys of juror knowledge appear to contradict this proposition, however, revealing substantial misconceptions on a number of discrete topics that have been the subject of significant study by social scientists.

==== Jury instructions ====
Criminal defense lawyers often propose detailed jury instructions as a mechanism to offset undue reliance on eyewitness testimony, when factors shown to undermine its reliability are present in a given case. Many state courts prohibit instructions detailing specific eyewitness reliability factors but will allow a generic instruction, while others find detailed instructions on specific factors to be critical to a fair trial. California allows instructions when police procedures are in conflict with established best practices, for example, and New Jersey mandates an instruction on the cross-race effect when the identification is central to the case and uncorroborated by other evidence.

Although instructions informing jurors of certain eyewitness identification mistakes are a plausible solution, recent discoveries in research have shown that this gives a neutral effect, "studies suggest that general jury instructions informing jurors of the unreliability of eyewitness identifications are not effective in helping jurors to evaluate the reliability of the identification before them"

==== Demonstratives ====
Demonstratives about eyewitness accuracy and reliability can be used as illustrative aids in opening statements and closing arguments, and with expert testimony and eyewitness testimony. A repository of video illustrative aids exists offering tests and demonstrations to prove or show during trial that eyewitnesses can be unaware of people and objects, make incorrect judgments, misremember and invent memories, and differently perceive and misperceive objects and events,

=== England and Wales ===
==== PACE Code D ====
Most identification procedures are regulated by Police and Criminal Evidence Act 1984 Code D.

===== Where there is a particular suspect =====
In any cases where identification may be an issue, a record must be made of the description of the suspect first given by a witness. This should be disclosed to the suspect or his solicitor. If the ability of a witness to make a positive visual identification is likely to be an issue, one of the formal identification procedures in Pace Code D, para 3.5–3.10 is normally used, unless it would serve no useful purpose (e.g. because the suspect was known to the witnesses or if there was no reasonable possibility that a witness could make an identification at all).

The formal identification procedures are:

- Video identification
- Identification parade: If it is more practicable and suitable than video identification, an identification parade may be used.
- Group identification: If it is more suitable than video identification or an identification parade, the witness may be asked to pick a person out after observing a group.
- Confrontation: If the other methods are unsuitable, the witness may be asked whether a certain person is the person they saw.

===== Where there is no particular suspect =====
If there is no particular suspect, a witness may be shown photographs or be taken to a neighbourhood in the hope that he recognises the perpetrator. Photographs should be shown to potential witnesses individually (to prevent collusion) and once a positive identification has been made, no other witnesses should be shown the photograph of the suspect.

==== Breaches of PACE Code D ====
Under s. 78 of the Police and Criminal Evidence Act 1984, the trial judge may exclude evidence if it would have an adverse effect on the fairness of the proceedings if it were admitted. Breach of Code D does not automatically mean that the evidence will be excluded, but the judge should consider whether a breach has occurred and what the effect of the breach was on the defendant. If a judge decides to admit evidence where there has been a breach, he should give reasons, and in a jury trial, the jury should normally be told "that an identification procedure enables suspects to put the reliability of an eye-witness's identification to the test, that the suspect has lost the benefit of that safeguard, and that they should take account of that fact in their assessment of the whole case, giving it such weight as they think fit". Informal identifications made through social media such as Facebook (often in breach of Code D), pose particular problems for the criminal courts.

==== Turnbull directions ====
Where the identification of the defendant is in issue (not merely the honesty of the identifier or the fact that the defendant matched a particular description), and the prosecution rely substantially or wholly on the correctness of one or more identifications of the defendant, the judge should give a direction to the jury:

1. The judge should warn the jury of the special need for caution before convicting the accused in reliance on the correctness of the identification or identifications. In addition he should instruct them as to the reason for the need for such a warning and should make some reference to the possibility that a mistaken witness can be a convincing one and that a number of such witnesses can all be mistaken.
2. The judge should direct the jury to examine closely the circumstances in which the identification by each witness came to be made and remind the jury of any specific weaknesses in the identification evidence. If the witnesses recognised a known defendant, the judge should remind the jury that mistakes even in the recognition of relatives or close friends are sometimes made.
3. When, in the judgment of the trial judge, the quality of the identifying evidence is poor, as for example when it depends solely on a fleeting glance or on a longer observation made in difficult conditions, the judge should withdraw the case from the jury and direct an acquittal unless there is other evidence which goes to support the correctness of the identification.
4. The trial judge should identify to the jury the evidence which he adjudges is capable of supporting the evidence of identification. If there is any evidence or circumstances which the jury might think was supporting when it did not have this quality, the judge should say so.

== Causes of eyewitness error ==
=== "System variables" (police procedures) ===
The police procedures used to collect eyewitness evidence have been found to have strong effects on the conclusions of witnesses. Studies have identified various factors that can affect the reliability of police identification procedures as a test of eyewitness memory. These procedural mechanisms have been termed "system variables" by social scientists researching this systemic problem. "System variables are those that affect the accuracy of eyewitness identifications and over which the criminal justice system has (or can have) control."

Acknowledging the importance of such procedural precautions as recommended by leading eyewitness researchers, in 1999 the Department of Justice published a set of best practices for conducting police lineups.

==== Culprit-present versus culprit-absent lineups ====
One cause of inaccurate identifications results from police lineups that do not include the perpetrator of the crime. In other words, police may suspect one person of having committed a crime, although in fact it was committed by another, still unknown person, who thus is excluded from the lineup. When the actual perpetrator is not included in the lineup, research has shown that the police suspect faces a significantly heightened risk of being incorrectly identified as the culprit.

According to eyewitness researchers, the most likely cause of this misidentification is what is termed the "relative judgment" process. That is, when viewing a group of photos or individuals, a witness tends to select the person who looks "most like" the perpetrator. When the actual perpetrator is not present in the lineup, the police suspect is often the person who best fits the description, hence his or her selection for the lineup.

Given the common, good faith occurrence of police lineups that do not include the actual perpetrator of a crime, other procedural measures must be undertaken to minimize the likelihood of an inaccurate identification.

==== Pre-lineup instructions ====
Researchers hypothesized that instructing the witness prior to the lineup might serve to mitigate the occurrence of error. Studies have shown that instructing a witness that the perpetrator "may or may not be present" in the lineup can dramatically reduce the likelihood that a witness will identify an innocent person.

==== "Blind" lineup administration ====
Eyewitness researchers know that the police lineup is, at center, a psychological experiment designed to test the ability of a witness to recall the identity of the perpetrator of a crime. As such, it is recommended that police lineups be conducted in double-blind fashion, like any scientific experiment, in order to avert the possibility that inadvertent cues from the lineup administrator will suggest the "correct" answer and thereby subvert the independent memory of the witness. The occurrence of "experimenter bias" is well documented across the sciences. Researchers recommend that police lineups be conducted by someone who is not connected to the case and is unaware of the identity of the suspect.

==== Confidence judgement ====
Asking an eyewitness their confidence in their selection with a doubleblind process can improve the accuracy of eyewitness selection.

==== Lineup structure and content ====
===== "Known innocent" fillers =====
Once police have identified a suspect, they will typically place that individual into either a live or photo lineup, along with a set of "fillers." Researchers and the DOJ guidelines recommend, as a preliminary matter, that the fillers be "known innocent" non-suspects. This way, if a witness selects someone other than the suspect, the unreliability of that witness's memory is revealed. The lineup procedure can serve as a test of the witness's memory, with clear "wrong" answers. If more than one suspect is included in the lineup – as in the 2006 Duke University lacrosse case, for example – then the lineup becomes tantamount to a multiple choice test with no wrong answer.

===== Filler characteristics =====
"Known innocent" fillers should be selected to match the original description provided by the witness.

If a neutral observer is able to select the suspect from the lineup based on the recorded description by the witness – that is, if the suspect is the only one present who clearly fits the description – then the procedure cannot be relied upon as a test of the witness's memory of the actual perpetrator. Researchers have noted that this rule is particularly important when the witness's description includes unique features, such as tattoos, scars, unusual hairstyles, etc.

===== Simultaneous versus sequential presentation =====
Researchers have also suggested that the manner in which photos or individuals chosen for a lineup are presented can be key to the reliability of an identification. Specifically, lineups should be conducted sequentially, rather than simultaneously. In other words, each member of a given lineup should be presented to a witness by himself, rather than showing a group of photos or individuals to a witness together. According to social scientists, use of this procedure will minimize the effects of the "relative judgment" process discussed above. It encourages witnesses to compare each person individually to his or her independent memory of the perpetrator.

According to researchers, use of a simultaneous procedure makes it more likely that witnesses will pick the person in the group who looks the most like their memory of the perpetrator. This introduces a high risk of misidentification when the actual perpetrator is not present in the lineup. In 2006, a pilot study was conducted in Minnesota on this hypothesis. Results showed that the sequential procedure was superior as a means of improving identification accuracy and reducing the occurrence of false identifications.

===== "Illinois Report" controversy =====
In 2005, the Illinois state legislature commissioned a pilot project to test recommended reform measures intended to increase the accuracy and reliability of police identification procedures. The Chicago police department conducted the study. Its initial report purported to show that the status quo was superior to the procedures recommended by researchers to reduce false identifications. The mainstream media spotlighted the report, suggesting that three decades' worth of otherwise uncontroverted social science had been called into question.

Criticism of the report and its underlying methodology soon emerged. One critic said that

"the design of the [Illinois pilot] project contained so many fundamental flaws that it is fair to wonder whether its sole purpose was to inject confusion into the debate about the efficacy of sequential double-blind procedures and to thereby prevent adoption of the reforms."

Seeking information on the data and methodology underlying the report, the National Association of Criminal Defense Lawyers (NACDL) filed a lawsuit under the Freedom of Information Act to gain access to the unreleased information. That suit remains pending.

In July 2007, a "blue ribbon" panel of eminent psychologists, including one Nobel Laureate, released a report examining the methodology and claims of the Illinois Report. Their conclusions appeared to have confirmed concerns of the early critics. Researchers reported that the study had a basic flaw that adversely affected its scientific merit, and "guaranteed that most outcomes would be difficult or impossible to interpret." Their primary critique was that variables had been "confounded", making it impossible to draw meaningful comparisons among the methods tested.

The critics found the following: The Illinois study compared the traditional simultaneous method of lineup presentation with the sequential double-blind method recommended by recognized researchers in the field. The traditional method is not conducted double-blind (meaning that the person presenting the lineup does not know which person or photo is the suspect). The critics claim that the results cannot be compared because one method was not double-blind while the other was double-blind.

But This criticism ignores the fact that the mandate of the Illinois legislature was to compare the traditional method with the academic method. More significantly, as an experiment to determine whether or not sequential double-blind administration would be superior to the simultaneous methods used by most police departments, the Illinois study provides an abundance of useful data which, at this point, seems to show that neither of the methods used in that experiment is superior to the other. What it does not provide is a clear reason why, because the effect of "double-blind" was not tested for the simultaneous lineups.

The Innocence Project Lineup studies mentioned here previously were never funded, largely because the expected grant funds were withdrawn in connection with economic difficulties. A separate grant was submitted to the Department of Justice in March 2009 by the independent Urban Institute to study simultaneous/sequential lineups in police departments in Connecticut and Washington, D.C. That study had been solicited by DOJ, but was unexpectedly cancelled in August 2009 due to "a low likelihood of success." The Urban Institute is seeking other funding.

==== Post-lineup feedback and confidence statements ====
Any feedback from the lineup administrator following a witness's identification can have a dramatic effect on a witness's sense of their accuracy. A highly tentative "maybe" can be artificially transformed into "100% confident" with a simple comment such as "Good, you identified the actual suspect." Preparation for cross-examination, including a witness thinking about how to answer questions regarding the identification, has also been shown to artificially inflate an eyewitness's sense of certainty about it. The same is true if a witness learns that another witness identified the same person. This malleability of eyewitness confidence has been shown to be far more pronounced in cases where the witness turns out to be wrong.

When there is a positive correlation between eyewitness confidence and accuracy, it tends to occur when a witness's confidence is measured immediately following the identification, and prior to any confirming feedback. As a result, researchers suggest that a statement of a witness's confidence, in their own words, be taken immediately following an identification. Any future statement of confidence or certainty is widely regarded as unreliable, as many intervening factors can distort it as time passes.

=== "Estimator variables" (circumstantial factors) ===
"Estimator variables" – that is, factors connected to the witness or to the circumstances surrounding their observation of an individual in an effort at identification can affect the reliability of identification.

==== Cross-racial identifications ====
Researchers have studied issues related to cross-racial identification, namely, when the witness and the perpetrator are of different races. A meta-analysis of 25 years of research published in 2001 showed that there is a definitive, statistically significant "cross-race impairment;" that is members of any one race are demonstrably deficient in accurately identifying members of another race. The effect appears to be true regardless of the races in question.

Various hypotheses have been tested, including racial animosity on the part of the viewer, and exposure level by the viewer to the other race in question. The cross-race impairment has been observed to substantially overshadow all other variables for witnesses, even when the persons tested have been surrounded by members of the other race for their entire lives.

==== Stress ====
The effect of stress on eyewitness recall is widely misunderstood in its effects by the general public, and therefore, by most jurors. Studies have consistently shown that stress has a dramatically negative impact on the accuracy of eyewitness memory, a phenomenon that witnesses themselves often do not take into account.

In a seminal study on this topic, Yale psychiatrist Charles Morgan and a team of researchers tested the ability of trained, military survival school students to identify their interrogators following low- and high-stress scenarios. In each condition, subjects were face-to-face with an interrogator for 40 minutes in a well-lit room. The following day, each participant was asked to select his or her interrogator out of either a live or photo lineup. In the case of the photo spread – the most common form of police lineup in the U.S. – those subjected to the high-stress scenario falsely identified someone other than the interrogator in 68% of cases, compared to 12% of misidentifications by persons in the low-stress scenario.

==== Presence of a weapon ====
The known presence of a weapon has also been shown to reduce the accuracy of eyewitness recall, often referred to as the "weapon-focus effect". This phenomenon has been studied at length by eyewitness researchers. They have consistently found that eyewitnesses recall the identity of a perpetrator less accurately when a weapon was known to be present during the incident. Psychologist Elizabeth Loftus used eye-tracking technology to monitor this effect. She found that the presence of a weapon draws a witness's visual focus away from other subjects, such as the perpetrator's face.

==== Rapid decline of eyewitness memory ====
Eyewitness memory

Some researchers state that the rate at which eyewitness memory declines is swift, and the drop-off is sharp, in contrast to the more common view that memory degrades slowly and consistently as time passes. The "forgetting curve" of eyewitness memory has been shown to be "Ebbinghausian" in nature: it begins to drop off sharply within 20 minutes following the initial encoding, and continues to do so exponentially until it begins to level off around the second day at a dramatically reduced level of accuracy. As noted above, eyewitness memory is increasingly susceptible to contamination as time passes.

A study unrelated to eyewitness identification in criminal cases reports that individuals have a much better memory for faces than for numbers. This would indicate that not all eyewitness identifications are equal. An identification where the eyewitness clearly saw the face of the perpetrator would be expected to be more reliable than one based on a combination of factors, such as ethnicity, estimated age, estimated height, estimated weight, general body type, hair color, dress, etc.

==== Other circumstantial factors ====
A variety of other factors affect the reliability of eyewitness identification. The elderly and young children tend to recall faces less accurately, as compared to young adults. Intelligence, education, gender, and race, on the other hand, appear to have no effect (with the exception of the cross-race effect, as above).

The opportunity that a witness has to view the perpetrator and the level of attention paid have also been shown to affect the reliability of an identification. Attention paid, however, appears to play a more substantial role than other factors like lighting, distance, or duration. For example, when witnesses observe the theft of an item known to be of high value, studies have shown that their higher degree of attention can result in a higher level of identification accuracy (assuming the absence of contravening factors, such as the presence of a weapon, stress, etc.).

== Reform efforts ==
=== United States ===
Largely in response to the mounting list of wrongful convictions discovered to have resulted from faulty eyewitness evidence, an effort is gaining momentum in the United States to reform police procedures and the various legal rules addressing the treatment of eyewitness evidence in criminal trials. Social scientists are committing more resources to studying and understanding the mechanisms of human memory in the eyewitness context, and lawyers, scholars, and legislators are devoting increasing attention to the fact that faulty eyewitness evidence remains the leading cause of wrongful conviction in the United States.

Reform measures mandating that police use established best practices when collecting eyewitness evidence have been implemented in New Jersey, North Carolina, Wisconsin, West Virginia, and Minnesota. Bills on the same topic have been proposed in Georgia, New Mexico, California, Maine, Maryland, Massachusetts, New York, Vermont, and others.

- Department of Justice Guidelines for Conducting Lineup Procedures
- NLADA resource on Eyewitness ID Issues
- Website of eyewitness researcher Dr. Gary Wells
- Dr. Steven Penrod's website, with links to substantial eyewitness ID research
- Dr. Nancy Steblay's website, with links to substantial eyewitness ID research
- NACDL's Eyewitness ID Resource page
- Dr. Roy Malpass's Eyewitness ID Research Laboratory Website
- Dr. Solomon Fulero's website, with links to relevant documents
- American Psychology-Law Society's page on eyewitness ID publications
