= Survivors Healing Center =

Not-for-profit in Santa Cruz County, California

- Company type: Non-profit organization
- Founded: 1987, Santa Cruz
- Headquarters: 104 Walnut Ave, Suite 201 Santa Cruz California 95060
- Number of employees: 3+ Staff, 12+ volunteers
- Website: www.survivorshealingcenter.org/

The Survivors Healing Center is a not-for-profit located in Santa Cruz County, California. Founded in 1987, its mission is to provide services for survivors of childhood sexual abuse and educate the public and service agencies about the issue. According to the Santa Cruz Volunteer Center, the Survivors Healing Center is one of the few centers in the world that focuses primarily on childhood sexual abuse.

== Mission statement ==
"Survivors Healing Center (SHC), a California 501(c)(3) non-profit organization, has been serving Santa Cruz County since 1987. SHC provides education, information, referrals, quality services, and support to survivors of childhood sexual abuse and their allies. Our primary goals are to empower those victimized by sexual abuse through a healing process and to prevent sexual abuse of children and youth."

== History ==
The idea for the Survivors Healing Center came about through poet and author Ellen Bass. She taught writing workshops for women, and was surprised by the number of women who wrote about childhood sexual abuse. Along with a group of other authors, she compiled an anthology of stories and writings of women who had been sexually abused as children called I Never Told Anyone. Along with therapist Amy Pine, she founded the Survivors Healing Center in 1987.

Ms. Bass began offering workshops in Santa Cruz to help women heal from the effects of childhood sexual abuse, and published another book The Courage to Heal (heavily criticized for contributing to the epidemic of false memory syndrome in the 1980s and 90s).

== Activities ==
The Survivors Healing Center offers group therapy for survivors of childhood sexual abuse. It also put on an annual "Art of Healing," , an event which allows survivors to share artwork they have created in expressive art therapy or any form of created art dealing with their recovery.

National statistics show one in three girls and one in six boys are sexually abused by the age of 18 (NCANDS, 2002). Responses to sexual abuse vary, but there is remarkable consistency in mental health symptoms, especially depression and anxiety. The Adverse Childhood Experiences study (ACE) demonstrated the relationship between traumatic experiences in childhood, such as physical and sexual abuse, and detrimental health-related behaviors including early initiation of smoking, illicit drug use, adolescent pregnancies, and suicide attempts. Participants with a higher ACE index also showed higher risk for obesity, heart disease and addiction problems. Additionally, survivors of childhood sexual abuse are vastly over-represented among the ranks of sex workers and those incarcerated.

For children and youth, there are numerous reactions to the trauma, including interfering with their ability to learn, personality changes, introduction of aggressive behaviors, sleep difficulties, startle reactions and impairment of a child’s sense of self-confidence and trust in the world.

Part of the mission of SHC is to raise awareness of childhood sexual abuse, which has been called a heavily unreported "epidemic". Often childhood sexual abuse goes unreported due to shame of the victim and/or coercion by the family to keep silent. In response to this and in association with April National Child Abuse Awareness Month, the Survivors Healing Center runs an annual "Walk to Stop the Silence," an event with the intention of bringing childhood sexual abuse into public awareness.
