= The Myth of Repressed Memory =

Book on repressed or false memory

- Author: Elizabeth Loftus; Katherine Ketcham
- Language: English
- Subject: Recovered memories
- Genre: Non-fiction
- Publisher: St. Martin's Press
- Publication date: 1994

The Myth of Repressed Memory: False Memories and Allegations of Sexual Abuse is a 1994 book by Elizabeth Loftus and Katherine Ketcham, published by St. Martin's Press.

They argued that the recovered memories movement, in which people stated they had long-forgotten sexual abuse from their families and just recently recovered memories, was based on falsehoods, and that therapists had suggested untrue events had occurred.

== Background ==
Loftus herself had conducted an experiment with university students on false memories. She had also co-authored a 1994 Psychology of Women Quarterly study, not mentioned in the book, which stated that of 105 women seeking treatment at a substance abuse center, about 20% had reported forgetting and re-remembering sexual abuse; more than 50% of the 105 women stated they had received sexual abuse in their childhoods. Loftus herself had been abused by a male babysitter at age six, and she stated in the book that she did not forget this instance; the lack of memory loss made her skeptical of the recovered memory movement. Coauthor Ketcham is a journalist.

== Contents ==
The book chronicles multiple recovered memory cases, including that of Lynn Price Gondolf, as well as the Thurston County ritual abuse case involving Paul Ingram, in which Loftus was personally involved. Katy Butler of the Los Angeles Times stated that the book "makes only a glancing reference to Marilyn Van Derbur".

== Reception ==
Barry Gordon of Johns Hopkins University wrote in the New England Journal of Medicine that the two sides in the false memory debate should find common ground as that is the only way total justice will occur; he stated "It is unfortunate that the war over so-called repressed or recovered memories has forced the two sides into such unreconcilable positions."

Butler described the book as "not the dispassionate work of scientists", that it does not "discuss many other cases that might contradict these books' central article of faith" and that the authors were "remarkably uninterested in the vagaries of memory of those who have sexually abused children." Butler concluded that while the book was a positive development for people who were falsely accused of sexual misconduct, she was afraid it would cause the formation of experts doubting sexual abuse victims and that it would "once again silence women and men from speaking—and being believed—about very real abuse".

Publishers Weekly stated that the "eye-opening book makes a compelling argument for caution."

== See also ==
- Making Monsters: False Memories, Psychotherapy, and Sexual Hysteria
- Spectral Evidence
- False memory syndrome
