= Spectral Evidence (1997 book) =

1997 true crime book

Spectral Evidence: The Ramona Case: Incest, Memory, and Truth on Trial in Napa Valley
- Author: Moira Johnston
- Language: English
- Genre: Non-fiction
- Publisher: Houghton Mifflin Company
- Publication date: 1997

Spectral Evidence: The Ramona Case: Incest, Memory, and Truth on Trial in Napa Valley is a 1997 book written by Moira Johnston and published by Houghton Mifflin Company about the Gary Ramona false memory case.

The author believed that Holly Ramona, who genuinely believed what she stated, was not experiencing genuine recovered memories.

According to Kirkus Reviews, the book portrays Gary Ramona "as not the best of fathers, but no rapist" and his ex-wife Stephanie Ramona "as a weak-willed trophy wife whose long-brewing anger at Gary found its expression" in her daughter's charges against her now ex-husband. Ann Rule of The Washington Post stated that the book "is packed with close-up views of both charlatans and true experts in the field of human memory".

The title is a reference to the Salem witchcraft trials.

== Reception ==
Vivian Dent, a San Francisco psychologist writing for The New York Times, stated that the book "stands as a reminder of how much in life resists understanding -- and as a caution against reaching too quickly for explanations that make only intuitive sense." According to Dent, the author "avoids the virulent righteousness" in the false memory debate.

Kirkus Reviews stated that it was "a frightening look into what happens when pop psychology is mistaken for therapy, and when the dubious fruits of that therapy are mistaken for truth." It added that the book "is a bit thin on some of the legal context for this case."

Rule stated that "Spectral Evidence is an important work."

Publishers Weekly stated that the book is "a gripping and well-researched account of a grim chapter in both scientific and family politics."

Jonathan Kirsch of the Los Angeles Times wrote that the book "tells the tale of a doomed family whose badges of success--[...]--concealed a cluster of profoundly dysfunctional relationships that collapsed under the weight of the secrets that they tried to keep from each other and the world around them." Kirsch argued that the "not entirely neutral" book, which does state that the truth will never be known with certainty, takes the point of view that the accusations were not true; Kirsch praised the book for using the points of view of Gary Ramona and of the people accusing him.

Marya Grambs of the San Francisco Chronicle wrote that the book is "a well-researched and dramatic account of a confusing subject and its intensely emotional contradictions" and "ably reveals the palpable anguish of the family and shows how intense feelings rippled outward" but that it had bias toward Gary Ramona.

== See also ==
- Recovered-memory therapy
- Making Monsters: False Memories, Psychotherapy, and Sexual Hysteria
- The Myth of Repressed Memory
