= Terr =

Terr. or TERR may refer to:

- Abbreviation for territory (subdivision)
- TIBCO Enterprise Runtime for R, a runtime engine for the R programming language developed by TIBCO Software
- short for terrorist, used by white Rhodesians for the insurgents during the Rhodesian Bush War

People with the surname Terr include:

- Lenore Terr (born 1936), an American psychiatrist
