= Making Monsters: False Memories, Psychotherapy, and Sexual Hysteria =

1994 book

- Author: Richard Ofshe, Ethan Watters
- Publisher: Charles Scribner's
- Publication date: 1994
- ISBN: 9780684196985

Making Monsters: False Memories, Psychotherapy, and Sexual Hysteria is a 1994 book by Richard Ofshe and Ethan Watters, published by Scribner's. It is critical of recovered memory movements, allegations of abuse by Satanic cults, and multiple-personality disorder diagnoses. Ofshe, who won a Pulitzer Prize for his news reporting, is a University of California, Berkeley professor of social psychology. Watters is a freelance writer.

It makes use of various case studies, including the George Franklin case. The book does not mention the Marilyn Van Derbur case.

Katy Butler of the Los Angeles Times was "not the dispassionate work of scientists". John F. Kihlstrom of Yale University, citing the authors' "anger" at the phenomenon of recovered memories, stated "There is nothing dispassionate about this book."

== Reception ==
Kihlstrom wrote a positive book review in the New England Journal of Medicine, stating that it was "a jeremiad, calling the field to police itself before the fall of recovered-memory therapy takes legitimate psychotherapy down with it."

Butler argued that the book "persuasively" made its arguments. She stated that it does not "discuss many other cases that might contradict these books' central article of faith" and that the authors were "remarkably uninterested in the vagaries of memory of those who have sexually abused children." Butler concluded that while the book was a positive development for people who were falsely accused of sexual misconduct, she was afraid it would cause the formation of experts doubting sexual abuse victims and that it would "once again silence women and men from speaking--and being believed--about very real abuse".

In 1994 Publishers Weekly stated that the book was "the most thoroughgoing and powerful critique to date of the use of recovered memories in psychotherapy."

== See also ==
- The Myth of Repressed Memory
- Spectral Evidence
- False memory syndrome
