= Kathleen McDermott (psychologist) =

Researcher

- Education: University of Notre Dame; Rice University
- Occupation: Professor
- Employer: Washington University in St. Louis

Kathleen McDermott is Professor of Psychological and Brain Sciences at Washington University in St. Louis. She is known for her research on how human memory is encoded and retrieved, with a specific interest in how false memories develop. In collaboration with Henry L. (Roddy) Roediger III, she developed the Deese-Roediger-McDermott paradigm used to study the phenomenon of memory illusions. McDermott received the 2004-2005 F.J. McGuigan Young Investigator Prize for research on memory from the American Psychological Foundation and the American Psychological Association's Science Directorate. She was recognized by the Association for Psychological Science as a Rising Star in 2007. McDermott is a Fellow of the Psychonomic Society and was honored with a 2019 Psychonomic Society Mid-Career Award.

== Biography ==
McDermott received her Bachelors of Art degree in psychology at the University of Notre Dame. She then went to graduate school at Rice University where she completed her M.A and Ph.D. under the advisement of Roediger. Upon graduating from Rice University in 1996, she completed a two-year postdoctoral fellowship at the Washington University School of Medicine where she applied functional neuroimaging techniques to the study of human cognitive processes. McDermott subsequently joined the faculty in Arts and Sciences at Washington University in St. Louis where she holds the title Professor of Psychological and Brain Sciences.

In 2023, McDermott was elected as a Fellow of the American Association for the Advancement of Science.

== Research ==
McDermott is best known for her work with Roediger in which they developed and refined a free recall task for the purpose of eliciting false memories (the Deese-Roediger-McDermott paradigm). Roediger and McDermott replicated a 1959 study by James Deese; participants were given a list of semantically related words (e.g., bed, snore, alarm, pillow, night, dream, wake, snooze, blanket, relax) and later asked to recall the words. They observed that participants were likely to recall semantic associates of the words on the list on an immediate free recall task: For example, participants often falsely recalled the word sleep when shown a list of words related to sleep, and they displayed a high level of confidence that the word sleep had been on the list. Roediger and McDermott suggested that participants confuse their memory of producing the word during the free recall test with having previously seen the word in the list.

McDermott applied fMRI to examine neural activity associated with false memory generation in the Deese-Roediger-McDermott paradigm. She and her colleagues observed similar patterns of activity in the parietal memory network when participants recall words that were on the list (true items) and those that were falsely recalled items (semantic lures). Such findings fit with predictions of the fuzzy-trace theory, suggesting that individuals utilize memory representations that record the gist of experiences rather than on memory representations of verbatim content.

In other work, McDermott and her colleagues used fMRI to create a map of human neural activity associated with word, object, and face encoding. They observed differential patterns of activation in the frontal cortex and medial temporal lobe what varied as a function of the stimuli to be encoded (verbal or non-verbal), with greater left-lateralization of the dorsal frontal cortex for word encoding, bilateral activation for object encoding, and greater right-lateralization activation for face encoding.

In work with Karl Szpunar and Jason Watson, McDermott mapped patterns of neural activity associated with the act of envisioning personally significant events, such as one's birthday. They observed that a set of regions within the left lateral premotor cortex, left precuneus, and right posterior cerebellum activate more strongly when the participant envisions future events compared to recollecting past events. They also noticed that when participants envisioned a future event, a set of regions including the bilateral posterior cingulate, bilateral parahippocampal gyrus, and left occipital cortex, which are associated with remembering previously encountered visual-spatial contexts is also activated. Such findings suggests that participants tend to envision future scenarios in well known visual-spatial contexts, with similar patterns of neural activation coinciding with remembering the past and imagining the future.

== Representative publications ==
- Kelley, W. M., Miezin, F. M., McDermott, K. B., Buckner, R. L., Raichle, M. E., Cohen, N. J., ... & Petersen, S. E. (1998). Hemispheric specialization in human dorsal frontal cortex and medial temporal lobe for verbal and nonverbal memory encoding. Neuron, 20(5), 927–936.
- McDermott, K. B. (1996). The persistence of false memories in list recall. Journal of Memory and Language, 35(2), 212–230.
- McDermott, K. B., & Watson, J. M. (2001). The rise and fall of false recall: The impact of presentation duration. Journal of Memory and Language, 45(1), 160–176.
- McDermott, K. B., Petersen, S. E., Watson, J. M., & Ojemann, J. G. (2003). A procedure for identifying regions preferentially activated by attention to semantic and phonological relations using functional magnetic resonance imaging. Neuropsychologia, 41(3), 293–303.
- Roediger, H. L., & McDermott, K. B. (1995). Creating false memories: Remembering words not presented in lists. Journal of Experimental Psychology: Learning, Memory, and Cognition, 21(4), 803–314.
