= Thurston County ritual abuse case =

1988 case of sexual abuse

- Date: 1988
- Location: Thurston County, Washington, U.S.
- Accused: Paul R. Ingram
- Charges: Child sexual abuse
- Sentence: 20 years in prison

The Thurston County ritual abuse case was a 1988 case in which Paul Ingram, county Republican Party Chairman of Thurston County, Washington, and the Chief Civil Deputy of the Sheriff's department, was accused by his daughters of sexual abuse, by at least one daughter of satanic ritual abuse, and later accused by his son in 1996 of abusing him between the ages of 4 and 12.

Ingram initially said he had no memory of such events, but said that he might have repressed memories of such an event, and investigators attempted to help him to "recover" these memories. Based on memories "recovered" during his investigations, he pled guilty, and his confession subsequently grew increasingly elaborate, detailed, and fantastical, while Ingram's young daughters and their friends subsequently accused a sizable number of Ingram's fellow Sheriff's department employees of ritual abuse. He now maintains he is innocent and alleges his confession was coerced. Ingram's daughters had been exposed to a church counselor who utilized methods based on recovered-memory therapy (RMT), a discredited pseudoscientific method of psychological examination that has been shown to produce false memories under suggestion. Ingram's interrogators similarly relied on RMT methods to produce his confession. Ingram tried to withdraw his plea and requested a trial or clemency, but his requests were refused. According to the appeals court, the original trial had conducted "an extensive evidentiary hearing on the coercion issue" and found that Ingram was unable to prove his claims of coercion, a situation his appeals did not change. Ingram was released in 2003 after serving his sentence.

The case has mistakenly been cited by proponents of the idea that satanic ritual abuse actually exists as proof because Ingram was found guilty; in reality, Ingram was never charged with "satanic ritual abuse" but with six counts of rape in the third degree, and was sentenced to twenty years. The "satanic" aspects of the case were dropped by the prosecution although the appearance of Satan was integral to Ingram's confessions. Paul Ingram's "recovered" memories, which were often incompatible with each other and universally uncorroborated by physical evidence, are today often cited as examples of false memory syndrome. The case has also been compared to the Salem witch trials.

== Background ==
The accusations appeared at a time when there were tremendous questions being raised about the accuracy of recovered memories of childhood abuse and incest. Books such as the self-help tome The Courage to Heal, the discredited satanic ritual abuse autobiography Michelle Remembers, and work by memory researchers such as Elizabeth Loftus all worked to support, contradict and challenge conventional beliefs about how memory and repression worked, or if the latter even existed.

Ingram's daughters had both been in therapy, one before the initial outcry, the other while the trial was ongoing. The Ingrams were also members of a local Pentecostal church that promoted the idea that Satan could control the minds of Christians, cause them to commit crimes, then remove the memories after the fact, and that God would not allow harmful false memories. While at a church retreat, a woman who claimed to possess prophetic power told Ingram's daughter that she had been sexually abused by her father.

== Accusations ==
Ingram was initially accused of sexually abusing both of his daughters over a period of years. Ericka, his eldest daughter, had originally claimed this abuse had stopped in 1979, but later, in a conflicting account, his other daughter Julie said it had happened less than five years before, drawing suspicion to the veracity and truth of the matter. When first interviewed in 1988 by Sheriff Gary Edwards and Undersheriff Neil McClanahan about the sex abuse accusations, Ingram "basically confessed during the first five minutes" as McLanahan would later state.

As the case proceeded, the purported accusations increased in scope and detail. Ingram was also accused of participating in hundreds of satanic rituals including the slaughter of 25 babies. Ericka claimed she had caught a sexually transmitted disease from him, and had a baby aborted when near term.

== False memories ==
Sociologist Richard Ofshe concluded that Ingram, because of his long-standing and routine experiences in his church, was manipulated by authority figures who conducted his interrogation, and that the confessions were the result of false memories being implanted with suggestion. Ofshe tested this hypothesis by telling Ingram that a son and daughter had accused him of forcing them to commit incest with each other. Interrogating officers had previously accused Ingram of this, but he denied it, and also denied Ofshe's accusation. Ofshe instructed Ingram to pray on the idea, and later Ingram produced a full, detailed written confession. Questioning the daughter who was supposed to have been involved, despite many other accusations against her father, she denied that such an incident had ever occurred. Upon being told that no such accusation had been made by either his son or daughter, Ingram refused to believe the incident wasn't real, maintaining "[i]t's just as real to me as anything else". Ofshe was thus convinced that Ingram's confessions were solely the result of extensive interrogation sessions and questions being applied to an unusually suggestible individual. He provided a report on his theory, but the prosecution initially refused to supply it to the defense, only doing so after being forced by the judge. Ofshe later reported the incident in a scientific journal.

== Remembering Satan ==
Ingram's story became the basis of the book Remembering Satan by Lawrence Wright. The Ingram case was also the basis for the TV-movie Forgotten Sins, in which John Shea played "Sheriff Matthew Bradshaw". Richard Ofshe, the only individual whose name was not changed for the movie, confirms that it is based on the Ingram case. Lawrence Wright, the author of Remembering Satan, received a "Story by" WGA credit for the movie.

== PAUL: The Secret Story Of Olympia's Satanic Sheriff ==
Ingram's story was the subject of filmmaker Nik Nerburn's 33-minute long 2013 film PAUL: The Secret Story of Olympia's Satanic Sheriff. The film was selected as the audience pick of the 2012 Olympia Film Festival and received the Award for Best Use of Archival Footage at the 2013 Seattle True Independent Film Festival.

== Sources ==
- Wright, L (1994). Remembering Satan: A case of recovered memory and the shattering of an American family. Knopf. ISBN 0-679-43155-1.
