= Deese–Roediger–McDermott paradigm =

Procedure in cognitive psychology

The Deese–Roediger–McDermott (DRM) paradigm is a procedure in cognitive psychology used to study false memory in humans. The procedure was pioneered by James Deese in 1959, but it was not until Henry L. Roediger III and Kathleen McDermott extended the line of research in 1995 that the paradigm became popular. The procedure typically involves the oral presentation of a list of related words (e.g., bed, rest, awake, tired, dream, wake, snooze, blanket, doze, slumber, snore, nap, peace, yawn, drowsy) and then requires the subject to remember as many words from the list as possible. Typical results show that subjects recall a related but absent word (e.g., sleep), known as a 'lure', with the same frequency as other presented words. When asked about their experience after the test, about half of all participants report that they are sure that they remember hearing the lure, indicating a false memory – a memory for an event that never occurred.

The simplicity of the paradigm and the ease with which DRM studies can be conducted have helped the DRM paradigm become popular among human memory researchers, as well as researchers from other fields.

== Background ==
The foundations of the DRM paradigm were developed by James Deese while working at Johns Hopkins University. In his 1959 article, "On the prediction of occurrence of particular verbal intrusions in immediate recall", Deese attempted to better understand why, when reciting a previously learned list of words, people sometimes recall a word that was never presented. He orally presented 50 undergraduate students with lists of 12 words, all strongly associated to an absent critical lure, and then immediately after each list was presented asked the students to recall all the items from the list. He found that the critical lure was recalled up to 44% of the time, but that this result varied over different lists. Although all the words in any list were associated with the critical lure, Deese found that the likelihood of false recall depended heavily on the ability of the list words to activate the critical lure – for example Deese claimed that a list containing 'short' could produce recall of the lure 'man', but a list containing 'man' could not produce recall of the lure 'short'.

Other research into false memories had tended to rely on experiences or stories, rather than word lists. Frederic Bartlett famously pioneered this area of research with his studies on remembering using the Indian folktale 'The war of the ghosts'. His studies had British college students learn the Indian folktale and then recall it again and again over time. He found that performance decreased over time, but also found that over time the students 'remembered' the story in a manner that increasingly followed British cultural norms. Although many researchers had trouble replicating Bartlett's results, a number of researchers followed this precedent of using meaningful prose to probe false memories, leaving the more controlled method of list learning underrepresented in the literature. While a few studies had looked at false memories for word lists, their results were not robust and tended to show very small effects.

== Roediger and McDermott ==
Little attention was given to Deese's experiment until the early 1990s when Henry L. Roediger III came across the 1959 article and decided to further explore the findings. Roediger eventually offered the project to his PhD student Kathleen McDermott, who completed the experiments as part of her PhD dissertation.

First, Roediger and McDermott replicated Deese's research by using the six lists from Deese's study that were the most successful in producing false recall. Roediger read the lists of 12 words to a class of students, and after each list asked them to recall as many words as possible from that list. Following the recall of the sixth list the students were given a pen-and-paper recognition memory test: a list of words comprising 12 studied and 30 unstudied items (including the critical lures) on which the students rated how confident they were that each word had appeared on one of the previous lists. The results showed that students recalled the critical lure 40% of the time, and that most were confident that the critical lures had actually appeared on the lists.

To follow up this study, Roediger and McDermott conducted a second experiment that allowed better experimental control. This time they created extra lists similar to those used by Deese, except the new lists had 15 items instead of 12 and the design was manipulated in a few minor ways. The major difference in this second experiment was the inclusion of a 'remember-know' judgement task. This task is applied to a recognition test in order to determine whether subjects recognise an item based on their memory, or based on familiarity. Subjects are first asked if an item is one they have seen before (old) or one that they have not (new), then for items that they have classified as 'old', subjects are asked to judge if they can mentally relive the experience of the item being presented (remember), or if they are confident that it occurred without having a memory for the event (know). Roediger and McDermott predicted that subjects were recalling an absent word because of a high sense of familiarity induced through the presented lists, and as such they would predominantly judge 'old' critical lures as being 'known' rather than 'remembered'. This prediction was not supported. The second experiment showed an increase in recall of the absent critical lures (to a level marginally significantly greater than actually presented words), which was paired with 72% of recognised critical lures being judged as 'remembered'. These results show clear evidence of subjects 'remembering' events that never occurred.

The robustness of the DRM effect and the simplicity of the experimental methods were welcomed in an area of research where small effects and elaborate stimuli were the norm. Furthermore, this paradigm allowed researchers to move past their reliance on recognition tests for false memories. Recall tests are better at showing false memories than recognition tests because subjects are required to access and recall the memory in full themselves, rather than being able to rely on some sense of familiarity. Roediger and McDermott were able to demonstrate a robust effect using recall tests as well as recognition tests, while employing simple word-list stimuli. Lastly, and perhaps most importantly, the experiments were able to show that subjects not only confidently recognised the absent word, but that they consciously remembered this lure appearing on the list, rather than relying on some feeling of familiarity to make an 'old' judgement.

== Explanations ==
Roediger and McDermott are quick to point out that their results could be explained by an associative model of memory. That is, the presentation of associated words could spread activation through an associative network to the absent lure word, and thus the false recognition of words could be due to residual activation. This model explains the higher false recognition in the second experiment as a product of more activation being spread due to the longer word-lists used. This theory has parallels with prototype theory, which claims that the presentation of patterns that match some prototype activates and increases the recognition of the prototype, even when it has never been presented. In terms of Roediger and McDermott's study, prototype theory would suggest that the list words activate the lure word (the prototype) that is then more easily recognisable. However, the fact that subjects reported 'remembering' the presentation of the critical lure suggests that there is some sort of explicit awareness of the lure during the presentation of words, which cannot be explained by prototype theory or by associative models of memory.

To supplement the idea of an associative model, Roediger and McDermott suggest that retrieval processes might play an important role in explaining the DRM phenomenon. They suggest that, by simply recalling the actual list words, the availability of the lure increases to a point where it is mistaken for a presented word. However, further research showed that retrieval processes could not account for the findings without also including encoding processes – Roediger and his colleagues later found that providing subjects with a warning about developing false memories had no effect if it was presented before the recall phase of the experiment, but it did reduce false memories if it was presented before the lists were read to subjects.

Other attempts at explaining the phenomenon have attributed it to a source-monitoring error, suggesting that subjects could have a memory for thinking about the lure during the reading of the list, and then mistakenly attributing the memory to the list presentation rather than their own thoughts. Alternatively, other scholars have claimed that the DRM effect is better explained by the discrepancy-attribution hypothesis, whereby the surprise of being tested drives the effect rather than the spreading of activation to some prototype.

Although their findings do not relate directly to the controversy, Roediger and McDermott assert that their results show that an individual's claim of a vivid memory for an event cannot be taken as conclusive evidence that the event actually occurred. Critics, however, have argued that the DRM paradigm does not reflect real life events because of the nature of the stimuli and the setting in which the study is conducted. Critics like Kathy Pezdek and Shirley Lam have suggested that it is inappropriate to compare the recognition of a word with the implantation of a memory for an entire childhood event. Roediger and McDermott maintain that their use of college students in a laboratory setting with mundane stimuli only strengthens their point, because these conditions should promote the most accurate remembering, and yet false memories are still formed.

== Applications ==
Because the DRM paradigm is easy to use, produces a clear and robust effect, and because Roediger and McDermott included full copies of the lists they used in their 1995 paper, the paradigm has become a popular research tool to help answer a number of questions.

False memory research using the DRM paradigm has highly contested implications for the criminal justice system. Memory plays an imperative role in criminal proceedings with evidence coming from witnesses, victims, suspects, interrogations and much more. This means the reliability and minimization of false memories is of extreme importance. Studies have been conducted with the DRM to understand important relationships like the correlation between false memories and varying stress levels, to understand the effects of a high stress environment on a witness, and the correlation between false memories and age, to understand the reliability of a child witness. Although these studies relate to the witness testimonial process, they cannot be used to make broad claims about the criminal justice system. The overall ecological validity of these experiments is very low due to the specific nature of the replication task making it is difficult to generalize the findings.

Researchers have also proposed the use of DRM lists in investigating the controversial issue of recovered memories for childhood sexual abuse. While studies shows that individuals claiming to have recovered previously forgotten memories of childhood sexual abuse are more likely to falsely recall and recognize critical lures than other individuals, this finding is not directly related to self-reported traumatic experiences. Rather, studies found that fantasy proneness as scored by the Dissociative Experiences Scale (DES) is the main factor rather than self-reported traumatization. A similar study found that individuals with higher PTSD scores and greater fearful-avoidant attachment tendencies showed less proficient memory monitoring for childhood sexual abuse word lists, and future research should approach this topic with caution.

Scientists from the University of Missouri have used the DRM paradigm to look at brain activity for real and false memories. They found evidence that suggests different brain processes may underlie the retrieval of real and false memories, with false-memory retrieval showing distinctly different patterns of neural activity to retrieval of real memories.

Further work on false memories has been conducted using the DRM paradigm including delving deeper into the methods of memory recall. In a five experiment study using different examples of the DRM paradigms from previous work, researchers recorded data consistent with the dual-retrieval processes of free recall. These retrieval processes are direct access, the retrieval of detailed items or verbatim memory, and reconstruction, the retrieval of the sense of meaning or gist memory. They also used this understanding and the robust results of the DRM tests to reaffirm the notion that these gist traces are the source of all false memories.

Another important application of the DRM paradigm is examining how the paradigm shifts from children to adults. Studies show that younger children have lower rates of false recall and recognition, likely due to a less developed semantic memory and therefore lacking the ability to make connections outside of the word lists given. Similarly, another study found that information processing differences at encoding between children and adults result in a lower rate of false recall among children due to an inability to activate lexical connections in word lists.

The DRM paradigm has also been used to probe a number of other psychological issues including: how stereotypes influence human thought; the thought process employed by drug addicts; and the types of impairments suffered by patients with amnesia.

The paradigm has been successfully used with other stimuli including sounds and auditory material.
