= Forgotten Sins =

- DVD cover
- Genre: Drama
- Based on: "Remembering Satan" by Lawrence Wright
- Written by: T. S. Cook
- Directed by: Dick Lowry
- Starring: William Devane; Bess Armstrong; John Shea; Lisa Dean Ryan; Dean Norris
- Music by: Mark Snow
- Country of origin: United States
- Original language: English

Production
- Executive producer: Kenneth Kaufman
- Producer: Nancy Hardin
- Cinematography: Henry M. Lebo
- Editor: William B. Stich
- Running time: 100 minutes
- Production companies: Patchett Kaufman Entertainment; Nancy Hardin Productions; World International Network

Original release
- Network: ABC
- Release: March 7, 1996

Forgotten Sins is a 1996 American drama television film directed by Dick Lowry and written by T. S. Cook. It is based on Lawrence Wright's two-part article "Remembering Satan", about the real-life case of Paul Ingram, which appeared in the May 17 and May 24, 1993 issues of The New Yorker. It originally aired on ABC on March 7, 1996.

It stars William Devane as Richard Ofshe, "a role to which William Devane brings his customary bristling panache" wrote Dorothy Rabinowitz in The Wall Street Journal. John Shea also stars as Matthew Bradshaw, a fictional character based on Paul Ingram. Bess Armstrong portrays Roberta 'Bobbie' Bradshaw, a character based on Sandy Ingram. Doogie Howser's Lisa Dean Ryan co-stars.
