= Henry L. Roediger III =

American psychology researcher

- Born: July 24, 1947 (age 78); Roanoke, Virginia
- Citizenship: United States
- Known for: Studies of human memory
- Scientific career
- Fields: Cognitive psychology
- Institutions: Washington University in St. Louis

Henry L. "Roddy" Roediger III (born July 24, 1947) is an American psychology researcher in the area of human learning and memory. He rose to prominence for his work on the psychological aspects of false memories.

== Biography ==
Born in Roanoke, Virginia, and raised in Danville, Virginia, Roediger received his undergraduate education from Washington and Lee University, graduating magna cum laude with a Bachelor of Arts in 1969. He went on to study at Yale University, receiving his PhD in 1973 with his dissertation "Inhibition in recall from cueing with recall targets". After receiving his doctorate he joined the faculty at Purdue University, where he stayed for fifteen years (except for two appointments as a visiting assistant professor at the University of Toronto: 1976–1978, and 1981–1982). In 1988 he was appointed as the Lynette S. Autrey Professor of Psychology at Rice University, and in 1996 he moved to Washington University in St. Louis where he was the Chair of Psychology until 2004. Since 1998 he has been the James S. McDonnell Distinguished University Professor of Psychology at Washington University.

Throughout his career, Roediger has become known for his focus on memory accessibility and retrieval – the ways in which we access and recall memories that we have stored. From this standpoint, he has developed theories, explored phenomena, and pioneered research techniques. He has supervised over 25 students in postgraduate research, and 9 postdoctoral fellows. His former students include Suparna Rajaram, Kathleen McDermott, Jeffrey Karpicke, and Elizabeth Marsh. Also, he has published over 175 articles and has an h-index of over 40. Alongside his academic work, Roediger oversaw the launch of the journal Psychological Science in the Public Interest, he has been editor of the journals Psychonomic Bulletin and Review and the Journal of Experimental Psychology: Learning, Memory and Cognition, and also has been involved in the administration of a number of scientific societies, most notably as the 2003–2004 president of the Association for Psychological Science.

== Elections, honours, and awards ==
Roediger has been elected as a Fellow of the American Association for the Advancement of Science, the American Psychological Association, the American Psychological Society (now the Association for Psychological Science), and the Canadian Psychological Association. He has also received a number of honours and awards.

Year	Award
1989 – 1990	Chair of the governing board of the Psychonomic Society
1992 – 1993	President of the Midwestern Psychological Association.
1994 – 1995	Guggenheim Fellowship
1996	Institute for Scientific Information Psychologist with highest impact
2002 – 2003	Chair of Society of Experimental Psychologists
2003 – 2004	President of the Association for Psychological Science
2004	Honorary Doctorate in Social Sciences from Purdue University
2008	Awarded the Howard C. Warren medal
2008	Arthur Holly Compton Faculty Achievement Award, Washington University

== The consequences of retrieval ==
Roediger was one of the first scholars to see the value of studying how humans retrieve memories. As Roediger started his career the cognitive revolution was in full swing. Human memory researchers had been predominantly focusing on memory storage, and were only beginning to look at memory encoding. However, inspired by his graduate advisor at Yale, Robert G. Crowder, Roediger began to see the importance of a retrieval-based approach to memory research. Since his doctoral dissertation, much of Roediger's research through the 1970s focused on retrieval based inhibition – the idea that retrieving an item reduces the subsequent accessibility of other stored items. This phenomenon is more commonly experienced when we try to remember a list of items and find that we keep thinking of the ones we have already recalled, rather than the ones we still need to remember. Roediger was able to show, under certain conditions, that recall cues can inhibit recall, which seemed inconsistent with previously widely accepted research findings showing that cues aid recall. Close to a decade of research helped to define the situations in which cues can aid recall and the situations in which cues can inhibit recall. In 1978 Roediger concluded that this dissociation occurs because, although some cues can facilitate recall, other cues provide irrelevant information, which hinders recall. Most importantly, Roediger showed that the accessibility of one memory biases the process of searching for another memory.

== Transfer appropriate processing ==
The 1980s saw an increase in research on implicit memory – memories that we have without being aware of them. The norm among researchers in this area was to test implicit memory using some task that required the subject to unintentionally remember previously learned information, such as completing a word fragment (E_E_ _ A _ T to ELEPHANT) or an anagram (PNLEHETA to ELEPHANT), as compared with testing for memories that we are aware of (explicit memory) using direct instructions to remember. These researchers found that the intentionally learned information was better remembered in an intentional remembering test, and unintentionally learned information was better remembered in an unintentional remembering test.

Roediger, however, approached this phenomenon from a more retrieval-based standpoint. Rather than looking at intentionality of learning, he looked to the conditions in which the information was to be recalled. He saw that unintentional learning seemed to be driven by bottom-up processes (using small details from the stimulus to build meaning) and that intentional learning seemed to be driven by top-down processes (using pre-existing concepts to make sense of a stimulus). He predicted that information learned in a bottom-up manner (e.g. reading a word) would be better recalled in a bottom-up test (e.g. completing a word fragment), and information learned in a top-down manner (e.g. generating a mental image) would be better remembered in a top-down test (e.g. recalling a list of words). Roediger hypothesised that the more that the processes used in retrieval matched those used in encoding, the better memory performance would be, and called this framework 'transfer-appropriate processing'. In a number of experiments Roediger and his colleagues showed that, rather than the intentionality when remembering, it was in fact the overlap between the conditions in which learning and remembering occurred that aided memory.

Neurophysiological studies have provided further evidence suggesting that transfer appropriate processes play a crucial role in memory. Studies using electroencephalography and functional magnetic resonance imaging have shown that the overlap in brain activity between encoding and retrieval facilitates memory performance.

The theory of transfer appropriate processing has since been adapted by numerous scientists to further study a number of different problems. Scientists have used transfer appropriate processing to better understand how humans that speak more than two languages might organise their different lexica, which has important implications for those trying to learn a new language as well as for potentially better understanding language disorders. Transfer appropriate processing also had a notable impact on the field of marketing, by providing a more comprehensive understanding of consumer memory. A focus on retrieval as the goal of advertising, and a better understanding of how interference can impact marketing communications, left a lasting impression on advertising practice.

Transfer appropriate processing theory has also been shown to be particularly valuable in exploring the organisation of memory, the workings of prospective memory – remembering to carry out previously planned actions, and in exploring how people learn to read fluently.

== False memories ==
Roediger did advanced research in the area of false memory, looking at why and how people develop memories of events that never happened to them. Throughout the 1990s, he and his colleagues took the methodology from a relatively unknown study by James Deese from 1959 and worked to develop it into one of the most widely used tools in human memory research; the DRM Paradigm. In a typical DRM experiment, a subject listens to a list of related words, for example; Thread, Pin, Eye, Sewing, Sharp, Point, Prick, Thimble, Haystack, Torn, Hurt, Injection, Syringe, Cloth, Knitting, and is then tested on their memory for this list. Typically, subjects will recall or recognise an associated, but unpresented lure word (Needle). Roediger and Kathleen McDermott asked people whether they actually remembered hearing this unpresented word, or if they merely felt like they had heard it. Participants often reported remembering hearing the word, illustrating memory for an event that never occurred.

Naturally, Roediger's approach to explaining this phenomenon was through retrieval processes. He thought that perhaps recalling list items would increase the availability of the lure word to a level where it became so available that it was mistaken for a presented word. However, retrieval processes alone were not enough to explain the findings – in a number of studies Roediger and his colleagues showed that a warning about developing a false memory had no effect if it was presented before retrieval, but could reduce false memories if presented before the encoding phase, suggesting an important role being played by the encoding process. Further work led Roediger and his research team to acknowledge both encoding and retrieval processes in explaining this phenomenon.

Although a wealth of research was conducted on the DRM paradigm, Roediger's interest in false memory went further still. His research into other false memory procedures helped further research on imagination inflation – the idea that imagining an event can make someone later believe that it really happened. Also, research into the social environment around creating memories helped to shed light on how other people's memories can become part of our own, a process Roediger and colleagues called 'Social Contagion'.

== Cognitive psychology and education ==
Roediger's most recent interests have involved applying knowledge from cognitive psychology research to the realm of education. Although many teachers feel that using standardized tests stifles creativity and takes away from time that could be better utilised in teaching, Roediger's studies indicate that the demands that testing places on recall significantly enhance learning compared to untested situations. His work suggest Fs that a ratio of 3–4 "tests" (uses of the learned information without recourse to reference material) to each study session (learning of new information) may be most effective.

Roediger's early research on testing effects and hypermnesia on final-exam results showed that subjects who receive two tests on newly learned material out-perform subjects tested only once, even if no feedback is given on any of the tests. This effect persists even if the group that is only tested once is given a second opportunity to study the material. Roediger explains this effect in terms of enhanced retrievability, claiming that testing provides practice at retrieving memories, making the memory itself stronger.

Roediger and his colleagues have also studied the form of test which is most effective. They report that short answer questions produce stronger testing-enhancements of learning compared to multiple-choice testing. Further research is being conducted to discover the optimal timing between tests and the best media for conducting tests.
