= Michael D. Yapko =

American psychologist

- Born: August 5, 1954 (age 72)
- Education: United States International University; University of Michigan
- Occupations: Clinical psychologist, Author
- Website: www.yapko.com

Michael D. Yapko (born August 5, 1954) is a clinical psychologist and author, whose work is focused on the areas of treating depression, developing brief psychotherapies and advancing the clinical applications of hypnosis.

== Education and professional career ==
Yapko attended the University of Michigan in Ann Arbor, where he earned a B.A. in psychology in 1976, before attending United States International University in San Diego for graduate studies, earning an M.A. in psychology in 1978, and his PhD in Professional Psychology, Clinical Specialization in 1980. He is licensed in California as both a psychologist and marriage and family therapist. He opened a private practice in 1979, which he maintained until retiring from clinical practice in 2007 to focus on writing and teaching.

He now regularly conducts clinical training in the areas of treating depression, psychotherapy, and applying clinical hypnosis. In addition to his private practice, he served as the director of The Milton H. Erickson Institute of San Diego. A non-profit organization for the study of psychotherapy, it is focused on training health and mental health professionals through conferences and workshops. He was also a founding member of the editorial board for The Ericksonian Monographs, a journal on Ericksonian hypnosis and psychotherapy.

During the 1980s, Yapko was a member of the faculty at the National University, San Diego, as well as a faculty member at United States International University, San Diego. From 2001 to 2004, he wrote the "Managing Your Mood" column for Psychology Today. He is currently a member of the board of advisory editors for the American Journal of Clinical Hypnosis. He also serves as an editorial consultant for the International Journal of Clinical and Experimental Hypnosis.

== Treating depression with clinical hypnosis ==
A proponent of Ericksonian techniques, Yapko employs hypnosis and other non-drug-based therapies in the treatment of depression. In his books and articles, he presents the view that the depression is a multidimensional disorder with multiple causal factors, including biological, psychological and social influences. As a result, he feels that patients respond better to psychotherapy in many cases and that while the use of antidepressants may be called for in some cases, they are often overutilized with too little being known about their efficiency or long-term effects.

== Repressed memory controversy ==
In the 1990s, Yapko generated some controversy among mental health professionals for saying that many therapists use inappropriately suggestive techniques to help patients recall repressed memories of childhood sexual abuse, memories that are sometimes suggested by the therapists themselves. In a survey he conducted of nearly 1,000 professional therapists, he reported that almost 19 percent of those surveyed said they knew of cases where they believed that a patient's trauma had been suggested by their psychotherapist, rather than based on a genuine experience. Moreover, for Yapko, the absence of technique-specific training of the therapists was a matter of considerable concern: less than 45% of those using hypnosis had received formal training in clinical hypnosis.

Yapko's 1994 book Suggestions of Abuse: True and False Memories of Childhood Sexual Trauma directly addressed the issue, explaining that some therapists use inappropriate techniques, including checklists of symptoms such as depression, low self-esteem, headaches, obesity, arthritis and acne, to diagnose sexual abuse that never actually occurred. One critic, Lenore Terr, a San Francisco psychiatrist and author of Unchained Memories, stated in an interview that she felt that Yapko "overstates the problem" but she admitted that "it sometimes happens".

== Affiliations and awards ==
Yapko is a member of the American Psychological Association, and a clinical member of the American Association for Marriage and Family Therapy. He is also a member of the International Society of Hypnosis, and a fellow of the American Society of Clinical Hypnosis.

He is a three-time winner of the Arthur Shapiro Award for the best book of the year on hypnosis from the Society for Clinical and Experimental Hypnosis, winning it first in 2001 for Treating Depression with Hypnosis, then in 2006 for Hypnosis and Treating Depression, and again in 2012 for Mindfulness and Hypnosis. He is also a recipient of The Milton H. Erickson Award of Scientific Excellence for Writing in Hypnosis from the American Journal of Clinical Hypnosis. In addition, he has been the recipient of the American Psychological Association's Division 30 Award for Distinguished Contributions to Professional Hypnosis, the Pierre Janet Award for Clinical Excellence from The International Society of Hypnosis (a lifetime achievement award), and The Milton H. Erickson Foundation's Lifetime Achievement Award For Outstanding Contributions to the Field of Psychotherapy.

== Works ==
Yapko is the author of 13 books on hypnosis and treating depression. He is also the author of numerous book chapters and articles, as well as a 4-CD/DVD set for overcoming depression using hypnotic methods. His works have been translated into nine languages. He was also chosen to write the sections on "Treating Depression" "Clinical Hypnosis," and "Brief Therapy" for the Encyclopædia Britannica Medical and Health Annuals.

- Hypnotic and Strategic Interventions: Principles and Practice at Google Books, Editor, New York: Irvington Publishers, 1986
- When Living Hurts: Directives for Treating Depression at Google Books, New York: Brunner/Mazel, 1988
- Brief Therapy Approaches to Treating Anxiety and Depression at Google Books, Editor, New York: Brunner/Mazel, Inc., 1989
- Free Yourself from Depression at Google Books, Emmaus, PA: Rodale Press, 1992
- Hypnosis and the Treatment of Depressions: Strategies for Change at Google Books, New York: Brunner/Mazel, 1992
- Suggestions of Abuse: True and False Memories of Childhood Sexual Trauma at Google Books, New York: Simon & Schuster, 1994
- Essentials of Hypnosis at Google Books, New York: Brunner/Mazel, 1995
- Breaking the Patterns of Depression at Google Books, New York: Random House/Doubleday, 1997
- Hand Me Down Blues: How to Stop Depression from Spreading in Families at Google Books, New York: St. Martin's, 1999
- Keys to Understanding Depression at Google Books, Sydney, Australia: The Written Word, 2001
- Treating Depression With Hypnosis: Integrating Cognitive-Behavioral and Strategic Approaches at Google Books, New York: Brunner/Routledge, 2001
- Hypnosis and Treating Depression: Applications in Clinical Practice at Google Books, Editor, New York: Routledge, 2006
- Depression is Contagious: How the Most Common Mood Disorder is Spreading Around the World and How to Stop It at Google Books, New York: The Free Press, 2009
- Mindfulness and Hypnosis: The Power of Suggestion to Transform Experience at Google Books, New York: W.W. Norton, 2011
- Trancework: An Introduction to the Practice of Clinical Hypnosis at Google Books, 4th Edition, New York: Routledge, 2012
- Focusing on Feeling Good: A Skill-Building, Experiential Self-Management Program for Overcoming Depression. CD/DVD, 4 disc set, 2006.
