= Ramona false memory case =

Lawsuit against a psychotherapist in California, US

The Ramona false memory case concerns a California man, Gary Ramona, who successfully sued psychiatrists who supposedly implanted false memories of abuse into his daughter. This was the first instance of a lawsuit against a therapist over implanted memories. It was also the first instance of a person who was not a patient bringing a malpractice suit in this field.

== Background ==
Gary Ramona, married to Stephanie Ramona, was a vice president for worldwide marketing of Robert Mondavi Winery and made an annual salary of $400,000. Daughter Holly Ramona, a student at the University of California, Irvine, had experienced bulimia and depression and sought treatment in the beginning of 1990. From 1989 to 1990, she was treated at Western Medical Center in Anaheim, California. Marche Isabella, a counselor for children, families, and marriages, told Holly and Stephanie that bulimia was usually caused by incest. Isabella stated that sexual abuse affected 60–70% of her patients experiencing eating disorders. Isabella had not received much training in the eating disorder realm although initial reports stated that this was her specialty. Western Medical chief of psychiatry Richard Rose also treated Holly Ramona. Holly, at this point believing her father raped her, agreed to take sodium amytal, administered by Rose, which was meant to recover memories.

Holly Ramona confronted her father at a March 15, 1990 meeting at Western Medical, in which her mother was also present. She accused Gary of raping her from the time when she was 5 until when she was 8, and that these memories were triggered when her father looked at her in a sexually charged way during a Christmas 1989 visit to their house. Gary's wife Stephanie divorced him, and he lost his family and job.

Isabella moved to Virginia and continued her career there, while Rose moved to Hawaii and stopped practicing psychiatry. Holly Ramona entered a master's program in clinical psychology at Pepperdine University.

== Lawsuit ==
In Napa County Superior Court, Gary Ramona, represented by lawyer Richard Harrington, sued Western Medical, Rose, and Isabella, stating that the parties gave his daughter false memories and that the alleged sexual abuse never occurred. He asked for $8,000,000 for wages he would have earned if he had not lost his job and general damages. Lenore Terr, an advocate of recovered memories, served as the chief witness of the defense.

Terr was cross-examined on whether Holly Ramona's flashbacks of abuse were accurate, and she stated that the one in which Holly gave a dog oral sex was not accurate. During the trial, Harrison Pope, a Harvard University physician and expert on bulimia, stated that bulimia was not influenced by one being sexually assaulted as a child.

In 1994, the jury voted 10–2 against the defendants, and awarded Ramona $500,000, with half corresponding to loss of future wages and the other half loss of past wages. Stephanie Ramona stated that she continued to believe the therapists and her daughter. Jury foreman Thomas Dudum stated that he disliked how Ramona perceived the verdict as a victory and that the jury intended "to make it clear that we did not believe, as Gary indicates, that these therapists gave Holly a wonder drug and implanted these memories."

B. Drummond Ayres Jr. of The New York Times stated that the decision bolstered critics against the repressed memory theory.

In the Harvard Law Review, Bowman and Mertz published an analysis of the Ramona case in the context of California courts’ history of third-party tort liability. They reported that the Ramona case was “atypical” and a “major diversion from the current state of tort law.” No adequate precedent for the third-party responsibility imposed in Ramona was found, and the authors concluded that the legal system should not hear future lawsuits imposing similar third-party liability upon therapists.

== Legacy ==
Author Moira Johnston wrote the 1997 book Spectral Evidence: The Ramona Case: Incest, Memory, and Truth on Trial in Napa Valley.

== See also ==
- Recovered-memory therapy
- False memory syndrome
