= Richard Ofshe =

American sociologist (born 1941)

- Born: Richard Jay Ofshe; February 27, 1941 (age 85); United States
- Education: Queens College of the City University of New York; Stanford University
- Known for: social psychology, pseudo-memory
- Scientific career
- Fields: sociology, social psychology
- Workplaces: University of California, Berkeley

Richard Jason Ofshe (born 27 February 1941) is an American sociologist and professor emeritus of sociology at the University of California, Berkeley. He is known for his expert testimony relating to coercion in small groups, confessions, and interrogations.

== False memories ==
Ofshe lists his areas of interest to be coercive social control, social psychology, influence in police interrogation, and influence leading to pseudo-memory in psychotherapy.

Ofshe has been characterized as a "world-renowned expert on influence interrogation". He believes that coerced confessional testimony is extremely unreliable and stated in a 1993 Time article that "Recovered memory therapy will come to be recognized as the quackery of the 20th century." In a more recent Time Magazine article in 2005, Ofshe is quoted as saying that false testimony does not just occur through coercion, but may also occur in instances of "exhaustion or mental impairment." However, he also stated that it is only recently that juries have been allowed to hear expert testimony about these kinds of theories.

John E. Reid, developer of an interrogation method called the Reid technique that Ofshe and others have argued can lead to false confessions, is a primary critic of Ofshe.

== Education ==
Ofshe studied at Queens College of the City University of New York for his BA in psychology and MA in sociology and at Stanford University for a PhD, sociology, sub-specializing in social psychology.

== Early career ==
Ofshe joined the faculty at the University of California, Berkeley at the level of assistant professor in the Department of Sociology in 1967. He was promoted to associate professor in 1971 and professor in 1982. At the University of California, he taught several courses, including a course entitled "Interpersonal Behavior in Small Groups". Ofshe was granted the title of Professor Emeritus in 2003.

== Honors ==
Ofshe has received several honors and recognition for his research and writings:

- John Simon Guggenheim Memorial Foundation Fellow, 1973–1974
- Recipient of Roy Dorcus Award for the Best Paper on Clinical Hypnosis of 1994. Awarded by the Society for Clinical and Experimental Hypnosis for "Recovered Memory Therapy and Robust Repression: Influence and Pseudomemories."
- For work on a series of articles that Ofshe contributed to on the Synanon movement, the newspaper, the Point Reyes Light, received the Pulitzer Prize for Public Service in 1979.

== Professional memberships ==
- American Sociological Association
- American Psychological Association
- American Psychological Society
- Sociological Practice Association
- Pacific Sociological Association

== Expert testimony ==
In 2002, Ofshe appeared on the Larry King Live show, discussing the reliability of confessions. In 2005, the Associated Press characterized Ofshe as a "cult expert", when commenting on the murder trial of Marcus Wesson. Ofshe's writings on interrogation, confession and miscarriages of justice are pointed to by the American Psychological Association as widely accepted within the psychology profession. His writings on interrogation and confession with professor Richard Leo are relied upon by the Supreme Judicial Court of Massachusetts and the Supreme Court of Canada.

Tyrone Noling (2006)

Prosecutors in the case of Tyrone Noling, relied on his confession testimony and gained his conviction of the murder of an elderly couple in Atwater Township, Ohio. Noling was sentenced to death and is on death row. In 2006, Ofshe asserted that this kind of testimony is not reliable and may not be true: "All the confessions should be classified as 'untrustworthy' and 'unreliable,'" Ofshe said that this was because "coercive interrogation tactics" were used by law enforcement to elicit such confessions.

The Norfolk Four (2005)

In July 1997, a young Navy wife, Michelle Moore-Bosko, was found murdered. Police began with one suspect but expanded their investigation when the first suspect's DNA did not match that at the scene. They promoted finally a crime with multiple offenders, theorizing that a total of eight men were involved in her rape and murder, although this was contrary to the evidence on site, at least two had strong alibis, and most of the men did not know each other. The first four men arrested made confessions to the crime following hours of severe police interrogation. Only the last man who confessed had DNA that matched the forensic DNA evidence at the crime scene and had a confession that was consistent with the evidence. The four other men who confessed all recanted their testimony; two pleaded guilty to rape and capital murder under threat of the death penalty; one was acquitted of murder but convicted of rape; and the last was convicted at trial. Three of the four were sentenced to life in prison. They had appeared to exhaust the appeals process in an effort to overturn their convictions based on false confessions elicited through coercion.

Lawyers associated with the Innocence Project agreed to take the case in 2005. The lawyers hired Ofshe as an expert witness in false testimony. After he investigated, he concluded: "Four innocent servicemen are languishing in prison for no reason, other than expediency". In 2009, the men were granted conditional pardons by the Virginia governor, and were freed from prison. This required that they continue to register as felons and sex offenders, however, and they wanted to clear their names entirely. In 2017 they received full pardons from Governor Terry McAuliffe, and are exonerated. In December 2018 they reached settlement with the city of Norfolk and state of Virginia after a civil suit based on their wrongful convictions.

Marty Tankleff (2005)

In 2005, Ofshe appeared on CBS's 48 Hours, commenting on the Marty Tankleff case. He was helping to work on Tankleff's appeals process. The detectives had obtained a confession from Tankleff but did not videotape it. Ofshe argued that it was a false confession and that if there had been a videotape, the court would have been able to observe the police interrogation methods used. "Ofshe believes that after being badgered for hours, Marty began to question his own memory—and the police gave him a way out." Tankleff has subsequently been exonerated, and the real killer identified.

Robert Burns Springsteen IV (2001)

In 2001, Ofshe testified in the case of alleged murderer Robert Burns Springsteen IV. Ofshe said that there was the possibility of police coercion in the confession. Judge Lynch stated that this was a judgement for the jury to make. Years later, Springsteen and the others who suffered miscarriages of justice were released by Judge Lynch.

Paul Ingram (1996) Ofshe was recruited by the investigators of the Paul Ingram case involving accusations of satanic ritual abuse. Ofshe concluded that Ingram was extremely suggestible and produced detailed pseudomemories after intense questioning and prayer, in which he attempted to visualize himself performing the acts he was accused of. Ofshe published a journal article about the phenomenon. His conclusions and methods were criticized at the time. Ofshe also testified at Ingram's 1996 pardon hearing. His observations about how false confessions can be coerced have been verified by numerous studies since then.

Country Walk case

Ofshe deposed that in the course of her many interrogations, Ileana Flores had been hypnotized, so that her testimony against her husband, Frank Fuster, cannot be trusted.

West Memphis 3 (1993)

Ofshe gave testimony in the case of the West Memphis 3, three suspects tried and convicted for the murders of three children in the Robin Hood Hills area of West Memphis, Arkansas, United States during 1993. Damien Echols, the alleged ringleader, was sentenced to death. Jessie Misskelley and Jason Baldwin were sentenced to life in prison. The case has received considerable attention. Many critics charge that the arrests and convictions were a miscarriage of justice inspired by a misguided moral panic and that the defendants were wrongfully convicted during a period of intense media scrutiny and so-called "satanic panic" of the 1980s and '90s. During Jessie's trial, Ofshe testified that the recording of his confession demonstrated a "classic example" of police coercion. The West Memphis Three were finally released from prison when they submitted an Alford Plea, maintaining their innocence while pleading guilty.

== Coercive police interrogation and false confession ==
Ofshe has testified as an expert on these subjects more than 350 times in 38 states, Federal court, State courts and Military courts throughout the US and the world. He was the first expert to qualify this area of testimony in Federal court in US v. Hall in 1997. The Utah Supreme Court in November 2013 held that a judge's failure to admit Ofshe's testimony was an abuse of the judge's discretion. Ofshe has qualified under both Frye and Daubert standards over 50 times, despite challenges by prosecutors.

== DIMPAC task force ==
After having to withdraw an amicus brief critical of Margaret Singer and favorable to the Unification Church of the United States due to member protest, the American Psychological Association's board of Social and Ethical Responsibility for Psychology (BSERP) rejected a report presented by the APA taskforce on Deceptive and Indirect Techniques of Persuasion and Control, stating that it lacked the scientific rigor and an evenhanded critical approach for and the imprimatur of the APA, Although Ofshe had nothing to do with the preparation of the report when the American Sociological Association replaced the APA as a supporter of the Moonies Ofshe investigated how this came about and discovered that the ASA's then president authorized the Association's name to be put on an amicus brief without knowledge or approval of the Association's board. Ofshe then became a subject of criticism and eventually he and Margaret Singer sued the APA and the ASA. Margaret Singer and Ofshe sued the APA in 1992 for "defamation, frauds, aiding and abetting and conspiracy". The case was dismissed by the court in 1994 on the basis that the claims of defamation, frauds, aiding and abetting and conspiracy constituted a dispute over the application of the First Amendment to a public debate over academic and professional matters; that the parties may be described as the opposing camps in a longstanding debate over certain theories in the field of psychology, and that the plaintiffs could not establish deceit with reference to representations made to other parties in the lawsuit.

In a further ruling, James R. Lamden ordered Ofshe and Singer to pay $80,000 in attorneys' fees under California's SLAPP suit law, which penalizes those who harass others for exercising their First Amendment rights. At that time, Singer and Ofshe declared their intention to sue Michael Flomenhaft, the lawyer that represented them in the case, for malpractice.

== Works ==
=== Books ===
- Utility and Choice in Social Interaction with co-author Lynne Ofshe
- Interpersonal Behavior in Small Groups
- The Light on Synanon – With co-authors David and Kathy Mitchell
- Making Monsters: False Memories, Psychotherapy, And Sexual Hysteria, with co-author Ethan Watters
- Therapy's Delusions: The Myth of the Unconscious and the Exploitation of Today's Walking Worried, with co-author Ethan Watters
- The Sociology of the Possible – served as Editor

=== Articles ===
- "The Social Psychology of Police Interrogation: The Theory and Classification of True and False Confessions." Studies in Law, Politics and Society, 16, pp. 189–251. Richard Ofshe and Richard Leo. 1997.
- "The Decision to Confess Falsely: Rational Choice and Irrational Action." Denver University Law Review. "Symposium: An Interdisciplinary Examination of Coercion, Exploitation and the Law. 74, 4, pp. 979–1122. Richard Ofshe and Richard Leo. 1997.
- "Defending the Innocent." The Champion. December. Richard Ofshe. 2007
- "Thought Reform Programs and the Production of Psychiatric Casualties", Psychiatric Annals, 20:4, April 1990, Margaret Thaler Singer, Ph.D., and Richard Ofshe, Ph.D.
- Attacks on Peripheral versus Central Elements of Self and the Impact of Thought Reforming Techniques, The Cultic Studies Journal, Vol 3, N°1, 1986, Richard Ofshe, Ph.D. and Margaret T. Singer, Ph.D.
- "Coercive Persuasion and Attitude Change", Encyclopedia of Sociology Volume 1, Macmillan Publishing Company, New York, By Richard J. Ofshe, Ph.D.
- Leo, Richard A.; Ofshe, Richard J. (1998). "The Consequences of False Confessions: Deprivations of Liberty and Miscarriages of Justice in the Age of Psychological Interrogation". Journal of Criminal Law and Criminology. 88 – via Questia.
- The Process of Status Evolution, M. Hamit Fisek, Richard Ofshe, Sociometry, Vol. 33, No. 3 (Sep., 1970), pp. 327–346
- The Impact of Behavioral Style and Status Characteristics on Social Influence: A Test of Two Competing Theories, Margaret T. Lee, Richard Ofshe, Social Psychology Quarterly, Vol. 44, No. 2 (Jun., 1981), pp. 73–82
