= Kathy Pezdek =

American psychologist

Kathy Pezdek is an American cognitive psychologist specializing in the study of eyewitness memory.

== Education ==
Pezdek received her B.S. in psychology from the University of Virginia, Fredericksburg, and her M.A. and Ph.D. in psychology from the University of Massachusetts Amherst.

== Career ==
She is a professor and associate dean of the School of Behavioral and Organizational Sciences (SBOS), Claremont Graduate University in Claremont, California. Pezdek is a cognitive psychologist specializing in the study of eyewitness memory. She frequently serves as an expert witness in the area of eyewitness identification and has testified on this topic in Federal, State and Superior Court cases.

Her extensive research has focused on a range of topics related to Law and Psychology that apply to both adults and children. These topics include face memory, false memory, suggestibility of memory, lineup techniques, and detecting deception. In recent years, her research on these topics has included using virtual reality equipment to better understand the role that police body cams might play when officers fill out incident reports.

Kathy Pezdek is a fellow of the American Psychological Society, has served as editor of Applied Cognitive Psychology and is currently on the editorial boards of the Journal of Applied Psychology and Legal and Criminological Psychology.

== Bibliography ==
Recent Pezdek publications include:

- Pezdek, K., Sperry, K., & Owens, S.M. (in press). Interviewing Witnesses: The Effect of Forced Confabulation on Event Memory. Law & Human Behavior.
- Pezdek, K., Blandon-Gitlin, I., Lam, S., Hart, R.E. & Schooler, J. (in press). Is knowing believing?: The role of event plausibility and background knowledge in planting false beliefs about the personal past. Memory & Cognition.
- Pezdek, K. & Blandon-Gitlin, I. (in press). When is an intervening lineup most likely to affect eyewitness identification accuracy? Legal and Criminological Psychology.
- Blandon-Gitlin, I., Pezdek, K, Rogers, M. & Brodie, L. (in press). Detecting deception in children: An experimental study of the effect of event familiarity on CBCA ratings, Law & Human Behavior.
- Pezdek, K. (2007). It's Just Not Good Science. Consciousness and Cognition, 16, 29–30.
- Pezdek, K. & Lam, S. (2007). What research paradigms have cognitive psychologists used to study "false memory," and what are the implications of these choices? Consciousness and Cognition, 16, 2-17.
- Pezdek, K., Blandon-Gitlin, I. & Gabbay, P. (2006). Imagination and Memory: Does Imagining Implausible Events Lead to False Autobiographical Memories? Psychonomic Bulletin & Review 13 (5), 764–769.
- Costanzo, M., Krauss, D., & Pezdek, K. (Eds.) (2006). Expert Psychological Testimony for the Courts. Mahwah, NJ: Erlbaum. ISBN 0-8058-5647-1
- Donaldson, S., Berger, D. & Pezdek, K. (Eds.). (2006). Applied Psychology: New Frontiers and Rewarding Careers. Mahwah, NJ: Erlbaum. ISBN 0-8058-5349-9
