= Ethan Watters =

American journalist

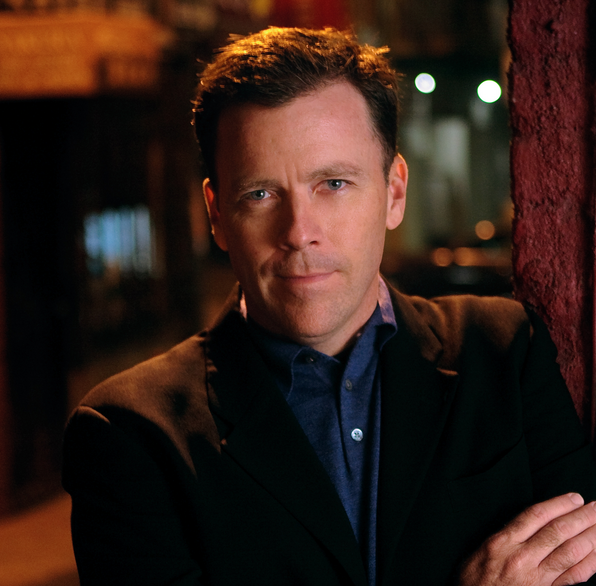
- Ethan Watters in 2016.
- Occupation: Journalist

Ethan Watters is an American journalist. He is the author of articles for The New York Times Magazine, Spin, Details, Mother Jones, Glamour, GQ, Esquire, and the San Francisco Chronicle Magazine as well as books. He has also appeared on a number of media outlets such as Good Morning America, Talk of the Nation, and CNN.

== Personal ==
Watters is married and has children. He and his family live in San Francisco, California.

== Career ==
In 1994, Watters co-founded, along with two others, the San Francisco Writers' Grotto, which now has 33 offices and serves as a workspace for over 50 writers each month. He also teaches classes here. His work focuses on psychiatry and social psychology.

== Books ==
- Urban Tribes: Are Friends the New Family?. Bloomsbury USA. 2003. ISBN 1-58234-441-8.
- Crazy Like Us: The Globalization of the American Psyche. Free Press. 2010. ISBN 978-1-4165-8708-8.
- With co-author Richard Ofshe
  - Making Monsters: False Memories, Psychotherapy, And Sexual Hysteria. University of California Press. 1996. ISBN 0-520-20583-9.
  - Therapy's Delusions: The Myth of the Unconscious and the Exploitation of Today's Walking Worried. Scribner. 1999. ISBN 0-684-83584-3.
