= The Courage to Heal =

1988 book by Ellen Bass and Laura Davis

- Cover of the first edition
- Authors: Ellen Bass; Laura Davis
- Language: English
- Subject: Sexual abuse
- Published: 1988 (Collins Living)
- Publication place: United States
- Media type: Print (hardcover and paperback)
- Pages: 640
- ISBN: 0-06-128433-5
- OCLC: 213480084
- Dewey Decimal: 616.85/8369 22
- LC Class: HQ72.U53 B37 2008

The Courage to Heal: A Guide for Women Survivors of Child Sexual Abuse (first published in 1988, with three subsequent editions, the last being a 20th anniversary edition in 2008) is a self-help book by poet Ellen Bass and Laura Davis that focuses on recovery from child sexual abuse.

The intent of the book is to provide a healing experience by means of explanations, practical suggestions, descriptions and accounts from women who have experienced sexual abuse. The authors say that individuals (mainly women) with a general set of symptoms may have been abused, but the memories of which have been repressed. They propose a variety of techniques to overcome their symptoms, including confronting their alleged abusers, adopting an identity as a "survivor", overcoming the associated trauma, and in cases where there is no memory of any abuse, recovering the memories. The book was a bestseller in North America and Europe. The 20th Anniversary Edition came out in 2008 and included an updated resource guide, additional stories and research.

The book has been criticized for being used primarily by incompetent therapists, for creating in children false memories of abuse, as well as for its authors' lack of qualifications, for creating an industry which has isolated and separated family members despite having no proof the abuse occurred, and for destructively replacing individual identities with that of a "survivor". Bass and Davis have also been criticized for leaping to unwarranted, implausible conclusions with significant consequences and for scientific errors found in the first edition that were not corrected in subsequent reprintings. Bass and Davis responded to the controversy surrounding the book by writing "Honoring the Truth: A Response to the Backlash", a new chapter included in the 1994 edition to respond to and rebut criticisms of the book, though this was removed from the 20th anniversary edition.

== Authors ==
The Courage to Heal is written by Ellen Bass, a poet and creative writing teacher and her student Laura Davis, an author and incest survivor. Bass worked as a counselor and group facilitator with survivors of child sexual abuse. Bass is married to a survivor of child sexual abuse and Davis was sexually abused as a child and participated in one of Bass' creative writing workshops. Bass and Davis attributed efforts to confront incest and child sexual abuse to the women's liberation movement. While working with students, Bass and Davis came to believe that the stories of some students were trying to convey painful memories of incest. From this idea, the two developed methods to assist students in recovering memories of abuse in childhood.

Neither Bass nor Davis have any training in psychotherapy or science, and they state that nothing in the book is based on any psychological theories. They have defended their lack of training, saying that a PhD is not necessary "to listen carefully and compassionately to another human being". Bass and Davis still define themselves as healers and experts in the area of child sexual abuse, due to leading workshops with victims.

== Summary ==
The 2008 edition is divided into six sections:

1. Taking Stock
2. The Healing Process
3. Changing Patterns
4. For Supporters of Survivors
5. Courageous Women
6. Resource Guide

The book includes in-depth interviews, writing exercises, and a resource list.

The third edition featured an afterword called "Honoring the Truth: A Response to the Backlash", which was added to respond to and rebut negative reactions to the book. The section has been characterized as an effort to dismiss all research contradicting the book as being part of a backlash against victims of incest. The chapter was removed from the 20th anniversary edition.

The book was written as a response to the authors' frequent encounters with women who were the victims of sexual abuse during their childhood and adolescence, and is predicated on the belief that extreme childhood trauma, of which sexual abuse is one, is spontaneously repressed. The authors suggest that people experiencing dysfunction in their lives (including a wide-ranging set of problems such as depression, anxiety, alcoholism, drug addiction, dysfunctional relationships, dissociative identity disorder, self-injury and suicidal thoughts) or feel there was something traumatic in their childhood should investigate these feelings; Bass and Davis also present what they believe is a path to healing from the trauma of alleged childhood abuse. The latest edition features language more inclusive of male sexual abuse victims.

The original edition of the book contained an influential chapter discussing satanic ritual abuse (though satanic ritual abuse is now considered a moral panic, the case specifically discussed in The Courage to Heal is that of Judith Spencer, which has since been discredited) and the discredited autobiography Michelle Remembers - citing the latter approvingly along with other alleged survivor stories of satanic ritual abuse. Subsequent editions renamed the phenomenon "sadistic ritual abuse". The Courage to Heal was part of the vision that childhood sexual abuse could be discovered with no corroborating evidence beyond a vague set of symptoms.

Psychologists Carol Tavris and Elliot Aronson state that basic errors regarding the science of memory have never been corrected between editions; in the third edition, the book stated that for a small number of women their symptoms may have originated in emotional rather than sexual abuse.

== Reception ==
The book was a bestseller in North America and Europe, and has been described as "the bible of the 'survivors' movement". Discussing the book in relation to narratives of incest, professors of English Janice Doane and Devon Hodges believe the book's popularity is due to it offering "an enormously enabling fantasy that by the same token refuses a complex analysis of the very means of recovery, writing, that it so confidently touts" and for promising to completely make sense of the reader's lives through the simple process of writing. A large number of therapists who used the book lacked training in research and awareness of the confirmation bias failed to appreciate the risks of seeing incest behind any symptom, or even a lack of symptoms and did not consider that other factors besides incest may have caused sexual problems in their clients.

A 1991 review states that "...reading and completing the exercises [does not] always result in all survivors overcoming all effects of child sexual abuse. Rather, survivors who have read the book have reported to me that it was helpful in dealing with the effects of the abuse." The book has been praised for being the first book for women to break open the taboo about sexual abuse. The book has also been praised for encouraging disclosure of abuse.

A 1995 review by psychologist and clinician Susan Contratto states that the book was perceived as dangerous by the antifeminist backlash since it legitimized stories of abuse as told by the survivors.

Bass and Davis have no formal training or qualifications in psychiatry, psychology or any form of treatment for mental illness. Psychologists Carol Tavris and Elliot Aronson state that despite the authors' lack of knowledge about the workings of memories, the scientific approach, or information and lack of qualifications, neither author has ever acknowledged the errors they have made in their descriptions of memory and trauma. They accuse the authors of basic errors regarding the science of memory that they say have never been corrected between editions; in the third edition, the book stated that for a small number of women their symptoms may have originated in emotional rather than sexual abuse. This lack of qualifications resulted in Bass, Davis, and others who adopted their approach leaping to conclusions that caused considerable harm, irrespective of their intentions. They have been accused of creating an industry which has isolated and separated family members despite having no positive proof the abuse occurred, and for replacing individual identities with that of a "survivor". Bass and Davis also never acknowledged criticisms that their description of how memory works was flawed or incorrect. Paul R. McHugh, professor of psychiatry at Johns Hopkins University and award-winning researcher in the field of memory describes the book as the "bible of incompetent therapists". A report for the Australian branch of the False Memory Syndrome Foundation (FMSF) found the book was linked to nearly 50% of the cases in which a false allegation of child sexual abuse was made based on recovered memories and a 2005 report by the Health Services Commissioner to the Minister for Health of Australia stated that some respondents from families where there were accusations of child sexual abuse called for the book to be banned, believing that it promotes the practice of recovered memory therapy. Frederick Crews has criticized the book for appealing not to women who have always remembered abuse, but rather being aimed at those who struggle to convince themselves they were abused as children in the absence of previously existing memories, and that the authors' claim to promote self-esteem are actually based "on a shattering of their readers' prior sense of identity and trust".

Elizabeth Loftus, an award-winning researcher on memory, stated that the book was certainly very comforting to individuals living with memories of abuse, but questioned the effect it would have on those who do not have such memories, and suggested The Courage to Heal may be one of many sources of false memories for some individuals. Loftus also stated that "All roads on the search for popular writings inevitably lead to [the book]". The Courage to Heal encourages the use of strategies such as guided imagery to access and attempting to elaborate details and emotions and discouraging individuals from questioning the memories recovered.

According to psychologist Bryan Tully, the authors believe that children frequently forget and repress memories of abuse, and claim that intuition and symptoms are sufficient to confirm abuse.

English professors Doane and Hodges note that the book was widely condemned for its use of checklists to determine if the reader was abused, describing the complaints made against the book and the stories it quotes as being as formulaic and only criticizes parts of the book. Doane and Hodges also state that the use of "you" throughout the book blinds Davis and Bass to their shaping of the identity of the reader and their story.

Bass and Davis responded to the controversy surrounding the book by writing "Honoring the Truth: A Response to the Backlash", a new chapter included in the 1994 edition to respond to and rebut criticisms of the book, though this was removed from the 20th anniversary edition. Since its second edition, the book has contained a case study of an individual who was allegedly a victim of satanic ritual abuse, now considered a moral panic.

A 2009 newsletter from the American branch of the False Memory Syndrome Foundation (FMSF) criticizes the 20th anniversary edition, saying, "No book did more to spread false memory syndrome". The book was described as vicious, and filled with errors about the FMSF and the nature of memory, though the anniversary edition is described as better, without the outrageous features of earlier publications and that in the new edition, the FMSF is not mentioned in the book's index. The book is still dedicated to recovering memories, and does not warn the reader of the doubts scientists have about its premises. The book's final case study is still a depiction of satanic ritual abuse, without noting the FBI's report that concluded there was no evidence for the phenomenon.

The third edition of the book, published in 1994, included a chapter entitled "Honoring the Truth," in which the authors respond to the book's critics. The FMSF criticized the chapter about their organization as filled with factual errors and written by a man who had no known credentials and no scientific publications in the relevant fields; the discussion of the FMSF was removed from the 20th anniversary edition.

== See also ==
- Amnesia
- Dissociation
- The Freudian Coverup
- Memory inhibition
