= I Never Told Anyone =

1983 book edited by Ellen Bass and Louise Thornton

I Never Told Anyone: Writings by Women Survivors of Child Sexual Abuse
- Cover for the 1991 re-release
- Author: Ellen Bass; Louise Thornton
- Subject: Child abuse
- Genre: Non-fiction
- Published: 1983
- Publisher: Harper and Row
- Media type: Print (paperback, hardback)
- Pages: 278
- ISBN: 0-06-096573-8

I Never Told Anyone: Writings by Women Survivors of Child Sex Abuse is a 1983 book edited by Ellen Bass and Louise Thornton and marked Bass's first published non-fiction work. It was published by Harper and Row and contains a collection of numerous child sexual abuse testimonials from a wide range of original source material including book excerpts, poems, and essays. The work was republished in 1991 through Harper Perennial and included a new afterword by Bass.

The book's title is a reference to some abuse survivors stating that they had never told anyone about their abuse due to various reasons such as threats of harm or that they did not think that they would be believed.

== Synopsis ==
I Never Told Anyone contains 33 testimonials from women who were sexually abused as children. The book begins with a set of statistics about childhood sexual abuse such as information about the sex of the abuse survivors and perpetrators. The testimonials are placed into the categories of abuse by fathers, relatives, friends and acquaintances, and strangers, each section of which is prefaced by a section discussing the specific category. In the work Bass also details her own experiences and feelings towards female sexuality in the United States.

== Development ==
The idea for the collection came from a writing workshop that Bass held in Santa Cruz, entitled "I Never Told Anyone". Bass, who had held writing workshops in the past, had been approached by a Boston area activist named Leslie who felt that the workshop, especially the act of publicizing its existence, would help serve to raise awareness and create social change. During the workshop Bass found that the issue of sexual abuse "hit a common frayed nerve among workshop participants", many of whom agreed to help with the collection. In publishing the collection Bass and Thornton hoped that it would show that there was therapeutic value in the survivors writing about their abuse and that the work's publication would help give them a voice.

== Reception ==
Psychology in the Schools reviewed the work positively in 1985, stating that it would have a "most definite place" in psychology literature. The journal Family Systems Medicine also reviewed I Never Told Anyone, which they felt was "excellent reading for practitioners involved in treating families, as it illuminates the many varieties of possible child sexual abuse." Kirkus Reviews was more critical, writing "For the women, telling has been cathartic, and others in their situation may experience a similar release. Those involved with children, however, will gain a better understanding of the problem from Robert Geiser's Hidden Victims (1979) and specific guidance from Linda Sanford's Silent Children (1980)."

I Never Told Anyone was criticized in the 1996 book Worlds of Hurt: Reading the Literatures of Trauma, where it was noted that it "frequently compromises the integrity of the personal narratives, reducing and softening their impact on the reader, while at the same time creating the impression that, within each category, all incest experiences are somehow alike. The latter is accomplished, like an uncomfortable fit in a glass slipper, but a little judicious toe and heel trimming." The book also noted that the framework used by Bass and Thornton for I Never Told Anyone classified abused women as within the framework of mental illness and that "By making it clear that child sexual abuse had dramatic effects upon its victims, and by advocating that women seek counseling, advice, and support from professionals and therapy groups, Bass and Thornton create the impression that the survivors are weak, harmless and "sick" - no threat to the status quo."
