= Ellen Bass =

American writer (born 1947)

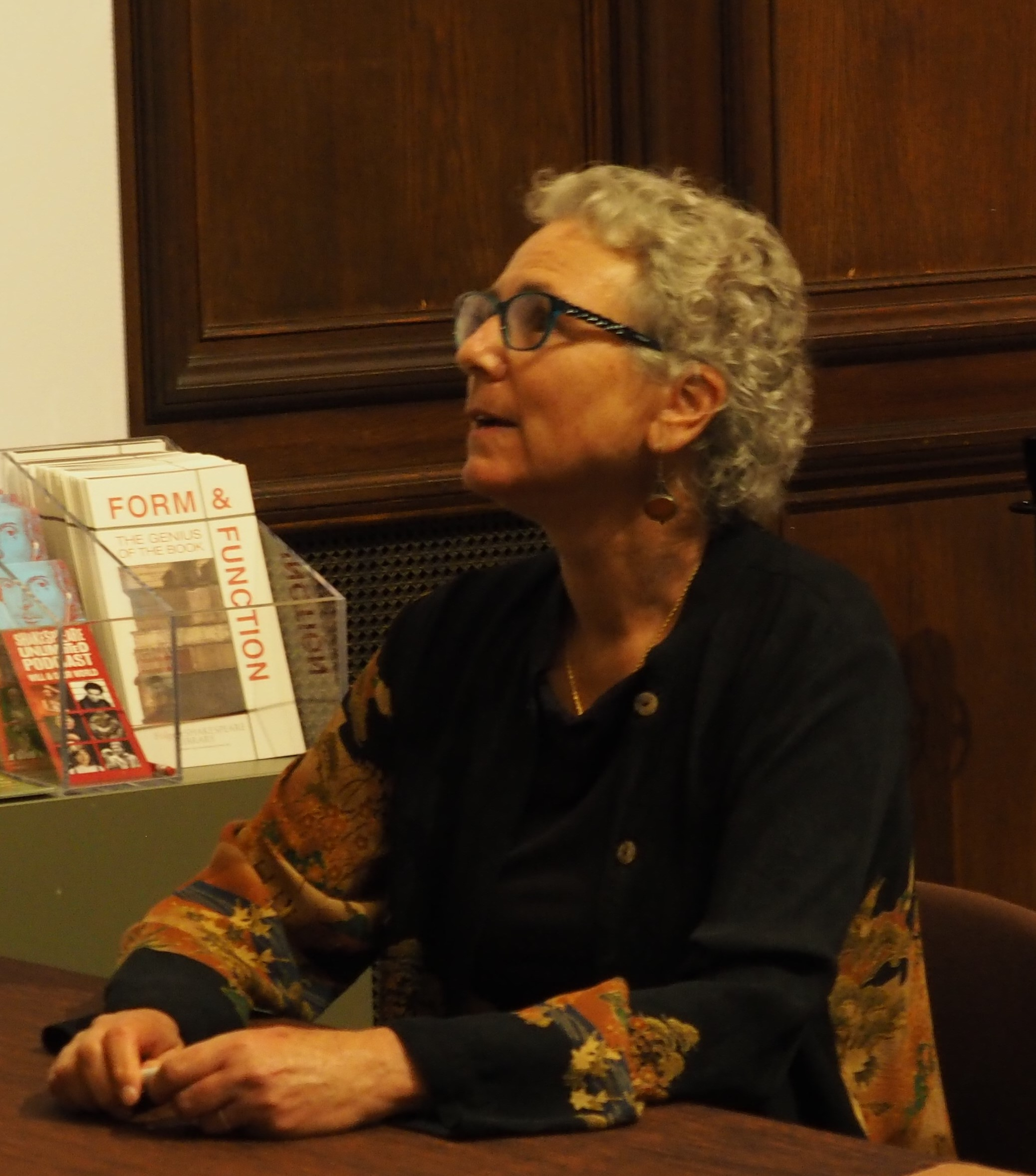
- Bass in 2018
- Born: June 16, 1947 (age 79); Philadelphia, Pennsylvania, U.S.
- Education: Goucher College (BA); Boston University (MA)
- Occupations: Poet; author
- Spouse: Janet Bryer
- Children: Saraswati Bryer-Bass; Max Bryer-Bass
- Writing career
- Genres: Poetry; Nonfiction
- Notable works: The Courage to Heal, Indigo, Like a Beggar, The Human Line, Mules of Love
- Notable awards: Pushcart Prize (2003, 2014, 2017); National Endowment for the Arts Fellowship (2014); Lambda Literary Award (2002)
- Website: ellenbass.com

Ellen Bass (born June 16, 1947) is an American poet and author. She has won three Pushcart Prizes and a Lambda Literary Award for her 2002 book Mules of Love. She co-authored the 1991 book The Courage to Heal about recovery from child sexual abuse. She received a fellowship from the National Endowment for the Arts in 2014 and was elected chancellor of the Academy of American Poets in 2017. Bass taught poetry at Pacific University and has founded poetry programs for people in prison.

== Early life and education ==
Bass grew up in Pleasantville, New Jersey, where her parents owned a liquor store. Her family later moved to Ventnor City, New Jersey, where she graduated from Atlantic City High School. She attended Goucher College, where she graduated magna cum laude in 1968 with a bachelor's degree. She pursued a master's degree in creative writing at Boston University, where she studied with Anne Sexton, and graduated in 1970.

== Career ==
From 1970 to 1974, Bass worked at Project Place, a social service center in Boston.

She co-wrote the best-selling The Courage to Heal with Laura Davis about healing from childhood sexual abuse, as well as developing training seminars for professionals, offering workshops for survivors, and lecturing to mental health professionals nationally and internationally. The book has been widely criticized; neither Bass nor Davis has any formal training in psychotherapy or psychiatry, and critics argue that the book's scientifically unsound therapeutic advice exacerbated the moral panic over satanic ritual abuse. She is a co-founder of the Survivors Healing Center in Santa Cruz, California, a non-profit organization offering services to survivors of child sexual abuse.

Bass teaches at the low-residency Master of Fine Arts program at Pacific University in Oregon. She has taught workshops in Santa Cruz, California since she moved there in 1974 as well as nationally. In 2013, she founded the Poetry Program at the Salinas Valley State Prison, which offers a weekly workshop to incarcerated men. In 2014, she also founded the Santa Cruz Poetry Project, which offers weekly workshops to people incarcerated in Santa Cruz County jails.

Bass has written poetry books including Indigo (2020), which was a finalist for the Paterson Poetry Prize, a Publishing Triangle Award, and a Northern California Book Award; Like a Beggar (2014), which was a finalist for the Paterson Poetry Prize, a Publishing Triangle Award, the Milt Kessler Poetry Book Award, the Lambda Literary Award for Lesbian Poetry, and a Northern California Book Award; The Human Line (2007); and Mules of Love (2002), which won the Lambda Literary Award for Lesbian Poetry. Her poems have been published widely in journals and anthologies, including The New Yorker, The American Poetry Review, The Kenyon Review, and Ploughshares.

Her nonfiction books include I Never Told Anyone (co-edited with Louise Thornton, HarperCollins, 1983); Free Your Mind (written with Kate Kaufman, HarperCollins, 1996); and The Courage to Heal (HarperCollins, 1988). They have been translated into twelve languages.

In 2017, Bass was elected as a chancellor of the Academy of American Poets and served until 2022.

Bass was named the Santa Cruz County Arts Commission Artist of the Year in 2019.

Bass lives in Santa Cruz with her wife, Janet Bryer. She has two children.

== Awards ==
Bass was awarded the Elliston Book Award for Poetry from the University of Cincinnati, the Nimrod/Hardman Pablo Neruda Prize, The Missouri Review'’s Larry Levis Prize, the Greensboro Review Poetry Prize, the New Letters Poetry Prize, the Chautauqua Literary Journal Prize for Poetry, and four Pushcart Prizes (2003, 2015, 2017). She has received fellowships from the Guggenheim Foundation, the National Endowment for the Arts, and the California Arts Council.

Indigo (2020) was a finalist for the Paterson Poetry Prize, a Publishing Triangle Award, and a Northern California Book Award. Like a Beggar (2014) was a finalist for the Paterson Poetry Prize, a Publishing Triangle Award, the Milt Kessler Poetry Book Award, the Lambda Literary Award for Lesbian Poetry, and a Northern California Book Award. The Human Line (2007) was named among the notable books of 2007 in the poetry section by the San Francisco Chronicle. Mules of Love (2002) won the Lambda Literary Award for Lesbian Poetry.

== Published works ==
=== Poetry ===
- I'm not your laughing daughter. University of Massachusetts Press. 1973. ISBN 9780870231285.
- Bass, Ellen (1973). No More Masks! An Anthology of Poems by Women. Co-edited with Florence Howe. Doubleday. ISBN 9780385025539.
- Of Separateness and Merging. Autumn Press. 1977. ISBN 978-0394734309.
- For Earthly Survival. Moving Parts Press. 1980.
- Our Stunning Harvest. New Society Publishers. 1984. ISBN 978-0865710535.
- Mules of Love. BOA Editions. 2002. ISBN 9781929918225.
- The Human Line. Copper Canyon Press. 2007. ISBN 9781556592553.
- Like A Beggar. Copper Canyon Press. 2014. ISBN 9781556594649.
- Indigo. Copper Canyon Press. 2020. ISBN 9781556595752.

=== Nonfiction ===
- Bass, Ellen (1991) [1983]. I Never Told Anyone: Writings by Women Survivors of Child Sexual Abuse. Co-authored with Louise Thornton and others. Harper Collins. ISBN 9780060965730.
- Bass, Ellen (2008) [1988]. The Courage to Heal: A Guide for Women Survivors of Child Sexual Abuse. Co-authored with Laura Davis. Harper Collins. ISBN 9780061284335.
- Bass, Ellen (2003) [1993]. Beginning to Heal: A First Book for Men and Women Who Were Sexually Abused as Children. Co-authored with Laura Davis. Harper Collins. ISBN 9780062270597.
- Bass, Ellen (1996). Free Your Mind: The Book for Gay, Lesbian and Bisexual Youth—and Their Allies. Co-authored with Kate Kaufman. Harper Collins. ISBN 9780060951047.

=== Children's books ===
- I Like You to Make Jokes with Me, But I Don't Want You to Touch Me. Lollipop Power Books/Carolina Wren Press. 1993 [1981]. ISBN 9780914996279.
