= Lenore Terr =

American psychiatrist (born 1936)

Lenore C. Terr
- Born: 1936 (age 89–90); New York City
- Education: University of Michigan
- Awards: Blanche F. Ittleson Award, Agnes Purcell McGavin Award
- Scientific career
- Fields: Psychiatry

Lenore C. Terr (born New York City, 1936) is a psychiatrist and author known for her research into childhood trauma. Terr graduated from the University of Michigan Medical School with an MD. She is the winner of the Blanche Ittleson Award for her research on childhood trauma. Terr is noted for her work studying the after-effects of the 1976 Chowchilla kidnapping on the 26 children who were buried alive for 16 hours after being kidnapped from a bus.

== Too Scared To Cry ==
Terr's book Too Scared to Cry (Basic Books, 1990) is divided into four parts focusing on childhood psychic trauma: emotions, mental work, behavior and treatment and contagion. The book describes several cases that illustrate the problem of children's statements and behaviors that are based in factitious traumatic events. Terr concludes children who suffered trauma before the age of three years are rarely able fully describe it verbally, instead reenacting events behaviorally. Terr draws on her interviews and follow-up with the victims of the 1976 Chowchilla kidnapping and with a number of similar children from surrounding towns, used as a control group. Lastly, Terr notes the distinction between a single, sudden traumatic event which is accessible to verbal remembering, versus repetitive or prolonged trauma that severely compromises accurate verbal recall.

== Repressed memory theory ==
Terr has been actively involved in advocating the psychological theory of repressed memory, a controversial proposition which asserts people can recall memories which have been repressed, frequently because of trauma. According to the theory, the memory can be suddenly recalled through visual or auditory stimuli and psychological therapeutic treatment. Terr was the primary expert witness for the prosecution in the criminal case of People v. Franklin (1990)—wherein George Thomas Franklin was convicted by a jury in 1990 for the homicide of nine-year-old Susan Nason, a murder that took place more than 20 years previously near Foster City, Calif. The prosecution and ultimate conviction was based solely upon the supposed recovered memory of Franklin's daughter, Eileen, who alleged she witnessed the murder and then for some reason repressed the memory for 21 years before suddenly recovering the memory of the murder and then reporting her recollection of the incident to the San Mateo County, Calif., sheriff's department. Terr was the prosecution's expert witness to support the theory of repressed memory and its corresponding recovery, which was instrumental in the conviction of Franklin. The conviction was later reversed by a federal appeals court, partially because so-called repressed memory is not acceptable as a contributing factor to conviction in a criminal proceeding. George Franklin was later exonerated by DNA evidence collected at the crime scene, casting further doubt on the use of repressed memories in criminal trials.

Terr was also the chief witness of the defense in the Gary Ramona trial.

== Personal life ==
In 1937, when she was just one year old, Lenore's parents Sam and Esther Cagen moved with her to Cleveland, Ohio, where she grew up and continued to live until 1957, when she married Abba Terr, a successful allergist, whom she met in 1953 while Lenore was an undergrad and her husband Abba was in medical school.

In 1962, Lenore and Abba moved to Ann Arbor and shortly thereafter had their first child, David, who now holds a doctorate degree in advanced mathematics and is teaching math in Las Vegas. Their second child, Julia, was born the following year and became a successful artist and film maker. Julia died in a tragic car accident in 2009, at age 45.

Lenore and Abba now live in San Francisco, where they have lived since 1970.

== Awards ==
- 1967 — Career teacher award from the National Institute of Mental Health (NIMH).
- Blanche F. Ittleson Award from the American Psychiatric Association.
- 2011 — Agnes Purcell McGavin Award for a Distinguished Career in Child and Adolescent Psychiatry, from the American Psychiatric Association.

== Works ==
=== Scientific publications ===
- Terr, LC (1979). "Children of Chowchilla: a study of psychic trauma". The Psychoanalytic Study of the Child. 34: 547–623. doi:10.1080/00797308.1979.11823018. PMID 504534.
- Terr, LC (August 1980). "Medical lessons from the schoolchildren of Chowchilla". The Journal of Pediatrics. 97 (2): 251–2. doi:10.1016/s0022-3476(80)80484-7. PMID 7400891.
- Terr, LC (January 1981). "Psychic trauma in children: observations following the Chowchilla school-bus kidnapping". The American Journal of Psychiatry. 138 (1): 14–9. doi:10.1176/ajp.138.1.14. PMID 7446775.
- Terr, Lenore C. (April 1983). "Time sense following psychic trauma: A clinical study of ten adults and twenty children". American Journal of Orthopsychiatry. 53 (2): 244–261. doi:10.1111/j.1939-0025.1983.tb03369.x.
- Terr, Lenore (January 1988). "What happens to early memories of trauma? A study of twenty children under age five at the time of documented traumatic events". Journal of the American Academy of Child and Adolescent Psychiatry. 27 (1): 96–104. doi:10.1097/00004583-198801000-00015. PMID 3343214.
- Terr, Lenore C. (January 1989). "Treating psychic trauma in children: A preliminary discussion". Journal of Traumatic Stress. 2 (1): 3–20. doi:10.1007/BF00975763. S2CID 144217910.
- Terr, Lenore C. (January 1991). "Childhood traumas: an outline and overview". The American Journal of Psychiatry. 148 (1): 10–20. doi:10.1176/ajp.148.1.10.
- Terr, Lenore C.; Bloch, Daniel A.; Michel, Beat A.; Shi, Hong; Reinhardt, John A.; Metayer, SuzAnne (October 1999). "Children's symptoms in the wake of Challenger: a field study of distant-traumatic effects and an outline of related conditions". American Journal of Psychiatry. 156 (10): 1536–1544. doi:10.1176/ajp.156.10.1536. PMID 10518163.
- Terr, LC (2013). "What becomes of infantile traumatic memories? An adult "wild child" is asked to remember". The Psychoanalytic Study of the Child. 67: 197–214. doi:10.1080/00797308.2014.11785495. PMID 26072564. S2CID 42468640.

=== Books ===
- Too Scared to Cry: Psychic Trauma in Childhood. Basic Books. 1992. ISBN 9780465086443.
- Unchained Memories: True Stories of Traumatic Memories Lost and Found. Basic Books. 1995. ISBN 9780465088232. OCLC 819605666.
- Beyond Love and Work. New York: Scribner. 1999. ISBN 9780684822396. OCLC 924270945.
- Figley, Charles R., ed. (2006). "13. Memoirs of a childhood trauma hunter". Mapping Trauma and its Wake: Autobiographic Essays by Pioneer Trauma Scholars. Routledge. ISBN 978-0-415-95140-1.
- Magical Moments of Change: How Psychotherapy Turns Kids Around. New York: WW Norton & Company. 2008. ISBN 9780393705300. OCLC 476908893.
