= Katy Butler =

American writer (born 1949)

Katy Butler (born 1949) is an American journalist, essayist and author of Knocking on Heaven's Door, the Path to a Better Way of Death, (Scribner, 2013) and The Art of Dying Well: A Practical Guide to a Good End of Life (Simon & Schuster, 2019).

== Career ==
Attended Sarah Lawrence College and earned a BA from Wesleyan University in Middletown, Connecticut.

Teaches writing at the Esalen Institute and was a speaker at The Nieman Foundation for Journalism at Harvard's 2008 and 2009 conferences on Narrative Nonfiction. Awarded writing residencies at Mesa Refuge, Hedgebrook, and Blue Mountain Center.

In the 1980s she exposed abuses of sexuality and power by leaders of American Buddhist communities.

She speaks at hospitals, medical schools and other locations about improving end-of-life medicine and the doctor-patient relationship.

== Publications ==
Butler's essays and articles have appeared in The New York Times Magazine, The New Yorker,The Wall Street Journal, Mother Jones, the Los Angeles Times Sunday Magazine, New West Magazine, Vogue, The Village Voice, Tricycle (The Buddhist Quarterly), More magazine, Psychotherapy Networker magazine, among others. Her writing career began with an internship at the San Francisco Bay Guardian, followed by a stint as a staff reporter for the San Francisco Chronicle that lasted for 12 years.

=== Books ===
- Knocking on Heaven's Door: The Path to a Better Way of Death (2013) The New York Times called Knocking on Heaven's Door a "thoroughly researched and compelling mix of personal narrative and hard-nosed reporting" and named it one of their 100 Notable Books of 2013. The book also received a Books for a Better Life Award in 2014 and was a finalist for the Dayton Literary Peace Prize.
- The Art of Dying Well: A Practical Guide to a Good End of Life (2019) is a guide to reducing the risks of medical overtreatment and finding those helpful medical allies in the last third of life.

== Awards and honors ==
In 2010, the Nieman Foundation named "What Broke My Father's Heart," an essay about how a pacemaker forced her "father's heart to outlive his brain" a "notable narrative." The essay, first published in the New York Times Magazine, also won awards for national journalism from the National Association of Science Writers and the Association of Health Care Journalists. Butler's essays have appeared in Best American Essays, Best American Science Writing and Best Buddhist Writing. In 2004, she was a finalist for a National Magazine Award for an essay about applying traditional religious practices to the chaos of modern life.

== Personal life ==
Married to Brian Donohue and lives in the San Francisco Bay Area. Born in South Africa in 1949. Grew up in England and the Boston area. A Buddhist since 1977, Butler was lay ordained by the Vietnamese monk Thich Nhat Hanh and has co-led small meditation groups.
