= Recovered-memory therapy =

Scientifically discredited form of psychotherapy

Recovered-memory therapy (RMT) is a controversial and scientifically discredited form of psychotherapy that uses one or more unproven therapeutic techniques (such as some forms of psychoanalysis, hypnosis, journaling, past life regression, guided imagery, and the use of sodium amytal interviews) to purportedly help patients recall previously forgotten memories. Proponents of recovered memory therapy claim, contrary to evidence, that traumatic memories can be buried in the subconscious and thereby affect current behavior, and that these memories can be recovered through the use of RMT techniques. RMT is not recommended by professional mental health associations. RMT can result in patients developing false memories of sexual abuse from their childhood and events such as alien abduction which had not actually occurred.

== Terminology ==
A 2018 online survey found that although 5% of a U.S. public sample reported recovering memories of abuse during therapy (abuse they reported having no previous memory of), none of them used the terminology "recovered memory therapy"—instead those recovering memories reported using a variety of other therapy types (e.g., behavioral therapy, EMDR, etc.). Practitioners of RMT generally utilize methods (such as hypnosis, age regression, guided visualization, and/or the use of substances such as sodium amytal) that are intended to recover true memories, yet known to support the creation of false memories.

== Research ==
The belief that a child can suffer horrific abuse, but immediately bury the memory deep in their psyche, remembering nothing of what had just happened, and grow up to be deeply psychologically scarred by this disassociation, while now commonplace in popular culture, is not supported by evidence.

A review article on potentially harmful therapies listed RMT as a treatment that will probably produce harm in some who receive it. Richard Ofshe, an American sociologist and expert on coerced and suggested testimony, describes the practice of "recovering" memories as fraudulent and dangerous. An inquiry by the Australian government into the practice found little support for or use of memory recovery therapies among health professionals, and warned that professionals had to be trained to avoid the creation of false memories. As part of its Crime Victims Compensation Program the state of Washington issued a report on the efficacy of RMT. It noted that the therapy had no positive benefits in the case studies analyzed and that "the ability of repressed memory patients to function in the activities of daily living is significantly and possibly irrevocably impaired as a direct result of the controversial therapy modalities.” Moreover, it recognized the potential for legal action from participants due to negative effects sustained from the program.

Studies by Elizabeth Loftus and others have concluded that it is possible to produce false memories of childhood incidents. The experiments involved manipulating subjects into believing that they had some fictitious experience in childhood, such as being lost in a shopping mall at age 6. This involved using a suggestive technique called "familial informant false narrative procedure," in which the experimenter claims the validity of the false event is supported by a family member of the subject. The study has been used to support the theory that false memories of traumatic sexual abuse can be implanted in a patient by therapists. Critics of these studies argue that the techniques do not resemble any approved or mainstream treatment modality, and there are criticisms that the implanted events used are not emotionally comparable to sexual abuse. Critics contend that Loftus's conclusions overreach the evidence. Loftus has rebutted these criticisms.

Some patients later retract memories they had previously believed to be recovered through RMT upon encountering critical literature regarding recovered memory therapy. This literature often highlights the therapy's dangerous and pseudoscientific aspects, thereby exposing them to scientific facts that prompt reconsideration. Patients have reported significant harmful effects due to the use of RMT.

A 2018 US study is the largest study known that surveys the general public about memory recovery in therapy. The study was presented to participants aged 50 years or older as a "Life Experience" survey and found that 8% of the 2,326 adults had reported seeing therapists, mostly starting in the 1990s, that discussed the possibility of repressed memories of abuse. 4% of adults had reported recovering memories of abuse in therapy for which they had no previous memory. Recovered memories of abuse were associated with most therapy types. A 1994 survey of 1000 therapists by Michael D. Yapko found that 19% of the therapists knew of a case in which a client's memory had been suggested by therapy but was in fact false.

== Professional guidelines ==
There are several individuals and groups that have published guidelines, criticisms or cautions about recovered memory therapy and techniques to stimulate recall:

- In the Brandon Report, a set of training, practice, research and professional development recommendations, the United Kingdom's Royal College of Psychiatrists advised psychiatrists to avoid use of RMT or any "memory recovery techniques", citing a lack of evidence to support the accuracy of memories recovered in this way.
- In 2004, the government of the Health Council of the Netherlands issued a report in response to inquiries from professionals regarding RMT and memories of traumatic child sexual abuse. The Health Council stated that while traumatic childhood experiences were major risk factors for psychological problems in adulthood, the fact that most traumatic memories are well-remembered but can be forgotten or become inaccessible though the influence of specific circumstances precludes a simple description of the relationship between memory and trauma. The report also notes that memories can be confabulated, re-interpreted and even apparently vivid or dramatic memories can be false, a risk that is increased when therapists, using suggestive techniques, attempt to link symptoms to past trauma, with certain patients and through the use of methods to stimulate memories.
- The Australian Hypnotherapists Association (AHA) issued a similar statement, for contexts where false memories of child sexual abuse may arise. The AHA acknowledges that child sexual abuse is serious, damaging and at least some memories are genuine, while cautioning that some questioning techniques and interventions may lead to illusory memories leading to false beliefs about abuse.
- The Canadian Psychological Association has issued guidelines for psychologists addressing recovered memories. Psychologists are urged to be aware of their limitations in knowledge and training regarding memory, trauma and development and "that there is no constellation of symptoms which is diagnostic of child sexual abuse". The guidelines also urge caution and awareness of the benefits and limitations of "relaxation, hypnosis, guided imagery, free associations, inner child exercises, age regression, body memory interpretation, body massage, dream interpretation, and the use of projective techniques" and special caution regarding any legal involvement of memories, abuse and therapy.

== Legal issues ==
In Ramona v. Isabella, Gary Ramona sued his daughter's therapist for implanting false memories of his abuse of her. In the first case putting recovered memory therapy, itself, on trial, he eventually was awarded $500,000 in 1994.

Discussing RMT in the New South Wales Parliament in 1995, the state Minister for Health, Andrew Refshauge – a medical practitioner – stated that the general issue of admissibility of evidence based on recovered memories was one for the Attorney General. In 2004 Australian Counselling Association issued a draft position statement regarding recovered memories in which it informed its membership of possible legal difficulties if they affirm accusations as true based solely upon discussion of a patient's recovered memories, without adequate corroborating evidence.

Legal scholar Alan Scheflin argued that legal and public debate over recovered-memory therapy often obscures the phenomenon of delayed trauma recall, noting that official diagnostic frameworks such as the DSM-IV recognize the condition as "dissociative amnesia". However, the validity of dissociative amnesia as a diagnostic construct remains highly controversial in scientific circles.

Recovered memory therapy was an issue in the criminal trials of some Catholic priests accused of fondling or sexually assaulting juvenile-turned-adult parishioners.

In a 2017 criminal case in Canada, a Nova Scotian clergyman, the Reverend Brent Hawkes, was acquitted in a case involving recovered memories of alleged historical sexual abuse when Justice Alan Tufts described in his ruling that the complainant's method of re-constructing his memory of alleged events after joining a men's group and hearing similar accounts from other "survivors" his evidence could not be reliable.

Several court cases awarded multimillion-dollar verdicts against Minnesota psychiatrist Diane Bay Humenansky, who used hypnosis and other suggestive techniques associated with RMT, resulting in accusations by several patients against family members that were later found to be false.

In 1999, the Netherlands Board of Prosecutors General formed The National Expert Group on Special Sexual Matters, in Dutch - Landelijke Expertisegroep Bijzondere Zedenzaken (LEBZ). LEBZ consists of a multidisciplinary group of experts whom investigating police officers and prosecutors are mandated to consult before considering arresting or prosecuting a person accused of sexual crimes involving repressed memories or recovered memory therapy. The LEBZ released a report for the period of 2003–2007 stating that 90% of the cases they consulted on were stopped due to their recommendations that the allegations were not based on reliable evidence.

== See also ==
- Amnesia
- Emotion and memory
- Fake memoir
- Gaslighting
- Memory inhibition
- Misery literature
- Repressed memory
- Psychological trauma
- Satanic ritual abuse
- Spectral evidence
