= False memory =

Psychological occurrence

In the field of psychology, a false memory is a phenomenon in which someone recalls something that did not actually happen or recalls it differently from the way it actually happened. Suggestibility, activation of associated information, the incorporation of misinformation, and source misattribution have been suggested as mechanisms that underlie a variety of types of false memory.

== Early work ==
The first known investigation of the false memory phenomenon was by psychology pioneers Pierre Janet and Sigmund Freud.

Freud was fascinated with the ways memory could be used and manipulated. Some modern day researchers say his studies have been quite influential in contemporary memory research, including research in the field of false memory. Pierre Janet was a French neurologist credited with significant contributions to memory research, specifically through his ideas on dissociation and memory retrieval through hypnosis.

In 1974, Elizabeth Loftus and John Palmer conducted a study to investigate the effects of language on the development of false memory. The study involved two separate but related experiments.

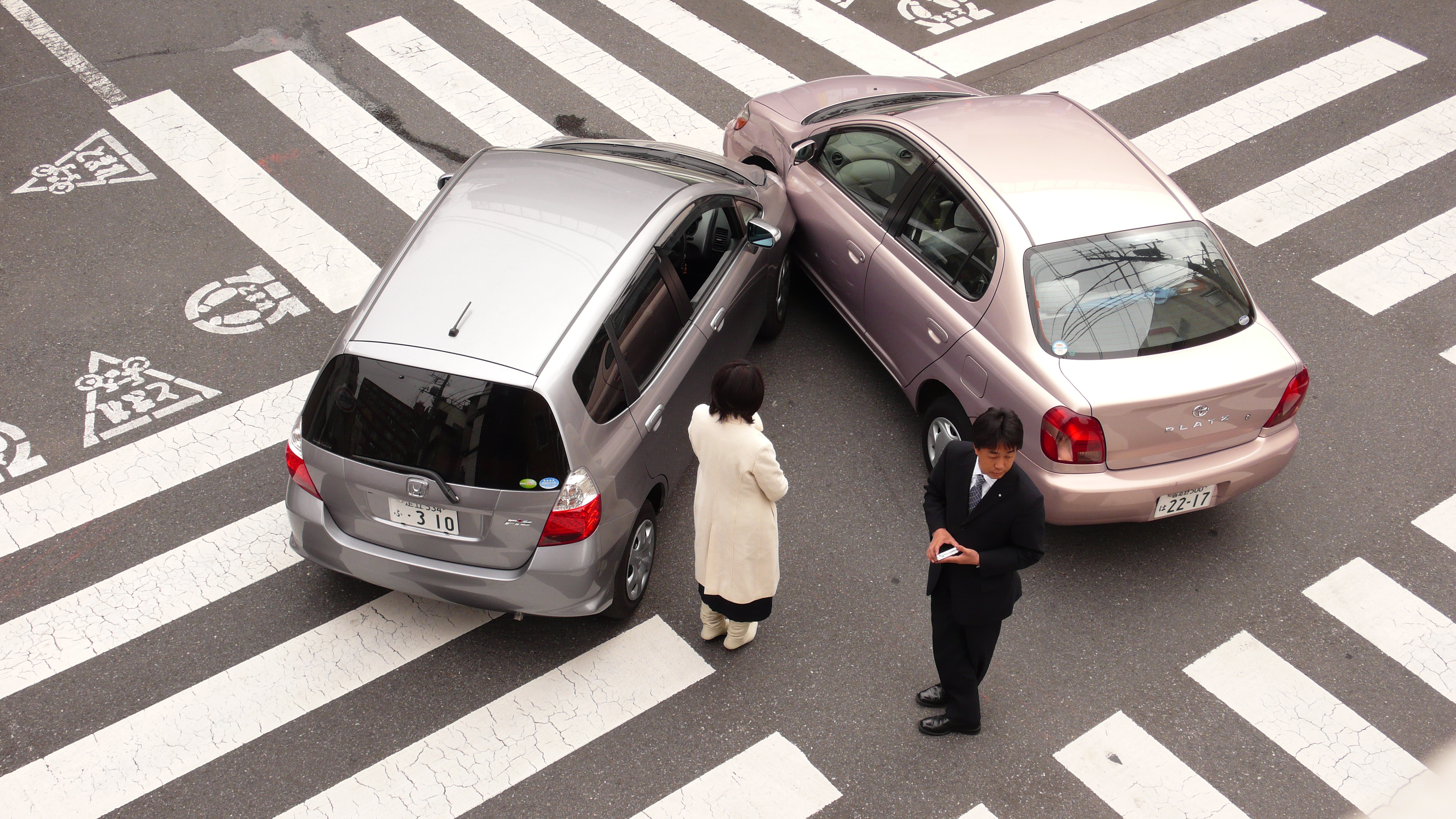
A 1974 study found that people recalled a previously seen video of a car accident differently if the question "About how fast were the cars going when they smashed into each other?" used alternate words such as bumped, collided, or contacted.

In the first experiment, 45 participants were asked to watch one of three different and randomly assigned videos of a car accident. The videos showed collisions at 20 mph (32 km/h), 30 mph (48 km/h) and 40 mph (64 km/h). Afterwards, participants filled out a survey, and one subset of them was asked, "About how fast were the cars going when they smashed into each other?" However, the verb used to describe the collision was different for other groups of participants. Rather than smashed, other verbs used included bumped, collided, hit, or contacted. If the actual speed in the video viewed by a participant was indeed the main factor in their estimate of it, one would expect the participant to give lower estimates for lower speed collisions. Instead, the word being used to describe the collision in the survey question seemed to predict participants' speed estimates better than the speed itself.

The second experiment also involved showing participants videos of car accidents, but the phrasing of one of the follow-up questionnaires was different. One hundred fifty participants were randomly assigned to three conditions. Those in the first condition were asked the same question as the first study using the verb smashed. The second group heard the word hit in the question. The final group was not asked about the speed of the crashed cars. The researchers also asked participants in all the groups if they had seen any broken glass, knowing that there actually was none in any of the videos. The responses to this question for the first two groups showed that whether broken glass was recalled or not heavily depended on the verb used in the earlier question; a larger number of participants in the "smashed" group asserted that there was broken glass than in the other groups.

The first main result here is that the words used to phrase a question can heavily influence the response given. Second, the phrasing of a question can influence the recall of previously unnoticed details. These results appear to support false memory as a true phenomenon.

Replications in different contexts (such as study participants' viewing videos of hockey games instead of car crashes) have shown that different scenarios require different framing effects to produce differing memories.

== Manifestations and types ==
=== Presuppositions and the misinformation effect ===
A presupposition is an implication resulting from specifically chosen language. If a person is asked, "What shade of blue was the wallet?", the questioner is implying that the wallet was blue. The question's phrasing presents the respondent with an implied fact. This presupposition can generate one of two phenomena: a true effect or a false effect.

- In true effect, the implication was accurate: in the above example, the wallet had in fact been blue. This makes the respondent's recall stronger, more readily available, and easier to extrapolate from. A respondent is more likely to remember a wallet as being blue if the prompt had indicated that it was blue than if the prompt had not said so.
- In false effect, the implication was false: from the same example, the wallet had in fact not been blue. This nevertheless influences the respondent's belief that it was true (i.e., that the wallet was blue), which affects their memory. The false effect can also alter a subject's responses to later questions, to which the subject answers so as to keep the responses consistent with the false implication.

Regardless of the effect's being true or false, the respondent is attempting to conform to the supplied information.

Loftus's meta-analysis on language manipulation studies suggested that the misinformation effect can influence the recall process and products of human memory. Even the smallest adjustment in a question, such as the choice of a definite vs. an indefinite article, can alter responses. For example, asking someone if they had seen "the" stop sign rather than "a" stop sign invokes a presupposition that a stop sign was in fact in the scene. In the experiment, this presupposition increased the number of people who responded that they had indeed seen the stop sign.

As noted above, the strength of verbs used in conversation or questioning can influence recall; the choice of words among "met", "bumped", "collided", "crashed", and "smashed" all influenced the intensity level of the car accident participants recollected. The words "bumped", "hit", "grabbed", "smacked", or "groped" would each paint a different picture of a potential offender in the memory of an observer of possible sexual harassment if the observer were questioned about it later. The stronger the word, the more intense the incident-as-remembered is. This in turn could generate further false memories to fit the recollection better (e.g. it could change how a person is thought to have looked or how fast a vehicle was thought to be moving before a collision).

=== Word lists ===
One can trigger false memories by presenting subjects with a continuous list of words. When subjects were presented with a second version of the list and asked if the words had appeared on the previous list, they found that the subjects did not recognize the list correctly. When the words on the two lists were semantically related to each other (e.g., sleep/bed), it was more likely that the subjects did not remember the first list correctly and created false memories (Anisfeld & Knapp, 1963).

In 1998, Kathleen McDermott and Henry Roediger III conducted a similar experiment. Their goal was to intentionally trigger false memories through word lists. They presented subjects with lists to study, all containing a large number of words that were semantically related to another word that was not found on the list. For example, if the word that they were trying to trigger was "river", the list would contain words such as flow, current, water, stream, bend, etc. They would then take the lists away and ask the subjects to recall the words on the lists. Almost every time, the false memory was triggered, and the subjects would end up recalling the target word as part of the list when it was never there. McDermott and Roediger even went as far as informing the subjects of the purpose and details of the experiment, and still the subjects would recall the non-listed target word as part of the word list they had studied.

=== Staged naturalistic events ===
Subjects were invited into an office and were told to wait there. After this, they had to recall the inventory of the visited office. Subjects recognized objects consistent with the "office schema", although they did not appear in the office. (Brewer & Treyens, 1981)

In another study, subjects were presented with a situation where they witnessed a staged robbery. Half of the subjects witnessed the robbery live, while the other half watched a video of the robbery as it took place. After the event, they were seated and asked to recall what had happened during the robbery. The results showed that those who watched the video of the robbery recalled more information more accurately than those who were live on the scene. Still, false memory presented itself in ways such as subjects seeing things that would fit in a crime scene that were not there, or not recalling things that did not fit the crime scene. This happened with both parties, displaying the idea of staged naturalistic events.

=== Relational processing ===
Memory retrieval has been associated with the brain's relational processing. In associating two events (in reference to false memory, say tying a testimony to a prior event), there are verbatim and gist representations. Verbatim matches to the individual occurrences (e.g., I do not like dogs because when I was five a chihuahua bit me) and gist matches to general inferences (e.g., I do not like dogs because they are mean). Keeping in line with the fuzzy-trace theory, which suggests false memories are stored in gist representations (which retrieves both true and false recall), Storbeck & Clore (2005) wanted to see how change in mood affected the retrieval of false memories. After using the measure of a word association tool called the Deese–Roediger–McDermott paradigm (DRM), the subjects' moods were manipulated. Moods were either oriented towards being more positive, more negative, or were left untouched. Findings suggested that a more negative mood made critical details, stored in gist representation, more accessible.

=== Mandela Effect ===
Specific false memories can sometimes be shared by a large group of people. This phenomenon was dubbed the "Mandela Effect" by paranormal researcher Fiona Broome, who reported having vivid and detailed memories of news coverage of South African anti-apartheid leader and President Nelson Mandela's (after whom the effect was named) dying in prison in the 1980s. (He actually died in 2013, decades after his release and after serving as President of South Africa from 1994 to 1999.) Broome reported that hundreds of other people had written about having the same memory of Mandela's death, some while he was still alive. Her speculation that the phenomenon arises from "movement between parallel realities" is in opposition to more mundane psychological theories.

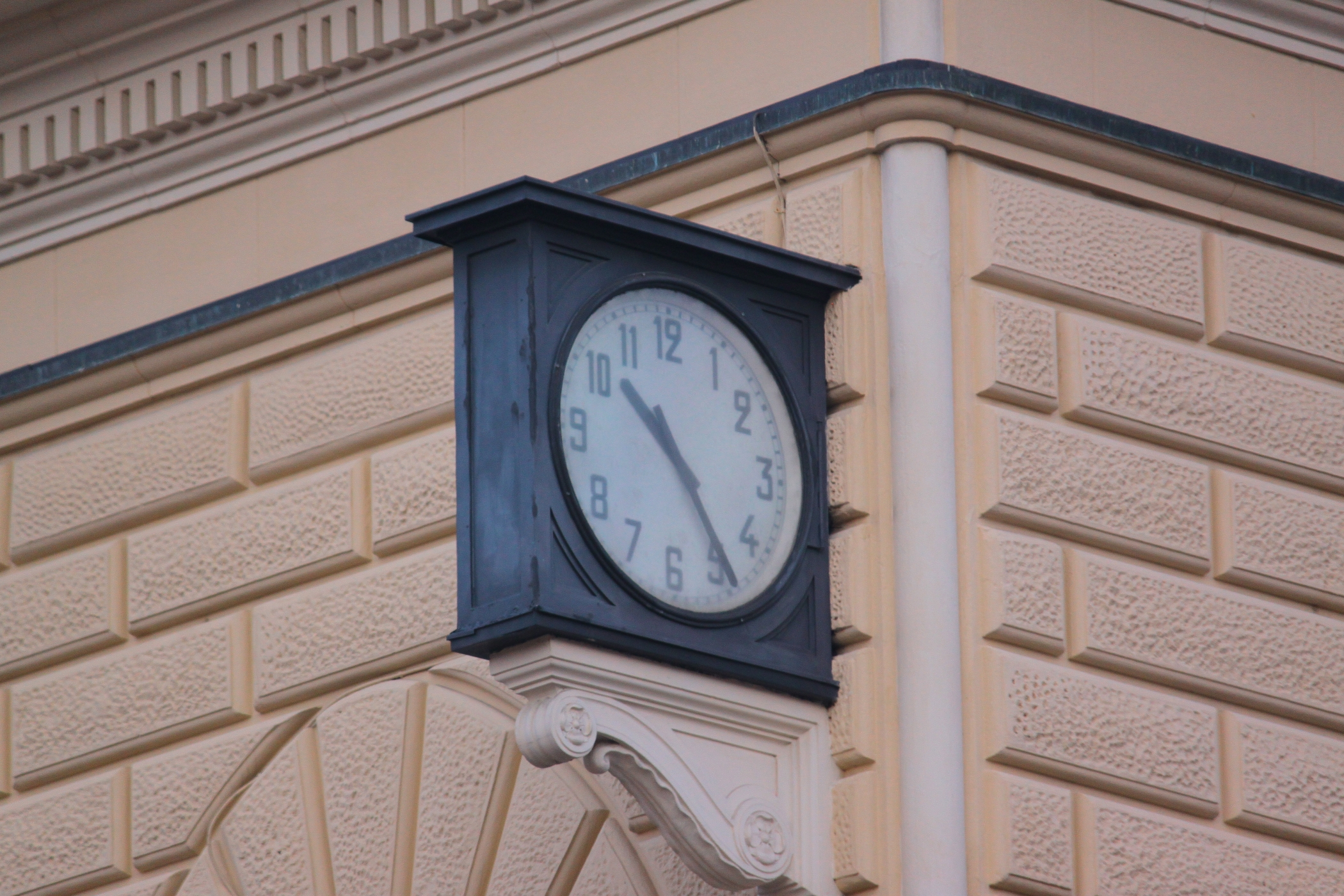
The Bologna station clock in Italy was permanently stopped in 1996 to commemorate the time of a 1980 bombing; some locals have the collective false memory of it having been stopped since 1980.

One well-documented example of shared false memories comes from a 2010 study that examined people familiar with the clock at Bologna Centrale railway station, which was damaged in a bombing in 1980, repaired shortly afterwards, and in 1996 stopped and permanently set to the time of the explosion, as a commemoration. In the study, 92% of respondents falsely remembered the clock as having been stopped since the bombing.

Other examples include:

- The Berenstain Bears being spelled "Berenstein"
- Looney Tunes being spelled "Looney Toons"
- The logo of clothing brand Fruit of the Loom containing a cornucopia
- Darth Vader telling Luke Skywalker, "Luke, I am your father" in the climax of The Empire Strikes Back (he instead says "No, I am your father")
- Mr. Monopoly wearing a monocle
- The existence of a 1990s movie titled Shazaam starring comedian Sinbad as a genie (which Snopes suggests could be a confabulation of real memories, possibly including Sinbad wearing a genie-like costume during a TV marathon of Sinbad the Sailor movies in 1994, the 1996 film Kazaam featuring a genie played by basketball star Shaquille O'Neal, and the 1960s animated genie-themed series Shazzan)
- The existence (and removal) of a burglar or seahorse emoji
- The Evil Queen's saying "Mirror, Mirror on the wall" in Disney's 1937 movie Snow White and the Seven Dwarfs (she actually says "Magic Mirror on the wall")
- Pikachu from Pokémon having a black tip on the end of its tail

Scientists suggest that these are examples of false memories shaped by similar cognitive factors' affecting multiple people and families, (Note: According to:) such as social and cognitive reinforcement of incorrect memories or false news reports and misleading photographs that influence the formation of memories based on them. False memories of Mandela's death could be explained as a person's conflating him with Steve Biko, another prominent South African anti-apartheid activist, who died in prison in 1977.

Memes about the Mandela effect and associated online jokes about a time traveler altering the past and turning the current era into "a glitch" became popular in the United States in 2016.

== Theories ==
=== Fuzzy-trace theory ===
The fuzzy-trace theory, proposed by Valerie Reyna and Charles Brainerd in the 1990s, suggests that information can be stored in two different ways: verbatim and gist. Verbatim representations are literal, precise, and exact copies of the information. On the other hand, gist representations are fuzzy, general, and abstracted representations of the information.

The fuzzy-trace theory relates to false memory because studies have found that when information is stored as a gist representation, it is more prone to manipulation. This is because information is stored in parallel pathways, not together. The term "verbatim traces" applies to the storing of surface features of an experience, whereas the term "gist traces" applies to the way in which the context and interpretation of an event are stored.

=== Activation monitoring framework (AMF) ===
False memories form when the brain reconstructs episodic memory (memories of a personal experience) using information from semantic memory (general knowledge and beliefs). Inaccurate and false recollections occur when suggestions, expectations, passage of time, and misleading information cause details from semantic memory to become mixed with episodic memories.

The activation monitoring framework (AMF) explains that in the Deese-Roediger-McDermott (DRM) memory task, studying related words activates associated concepts in semantic memory, including a related word, called the critical lure, that was never presented. If the brain fails to correctly monitor the source of that activation in episodic memory, people may mistakenly remember the critical lure as something they actually saw or heard.

Semantic and episodic memory play opposing roles in false memory formation. According to Gatti et al. (2024), subjects who participated in the DRM that possessed a higher level of language and general knowledge (semantic memory) were more likely to falsely recognize the critical lure. On the other hand, those with a higher ability to recall specific events including time and spatial context (episodic memory) were more accurate in identifying which words were on the original study list. These findings can help support our understanding of false memory formation by showing both components (words processed and reliance on semantic memory) that are active during the DRM task and participants' episodic memory is also actively involved in word recall.

=== Strength hypothesis ===
The strength hypothesis states that in strong situations (situations where one course of action is encouraged more than any other course of action due to the objective payoff), people are expected to demonstrate rational behavior, basing their behavior on the objective payoff.

An example of this is the collective laws of a country. Most of its citizens, no matter how daring, will conform to these laws, because the objective payoff is personal safety.

=== Construction hypothesis ===
The construction hypothesis says that if a true piece of information being provided can alter a respondent's answer, then so can a false piece of information.

Construction hypothesis has major implications for explanations on the malleability of memory. Upon asking a respondent a question that provides a presupposition, the respondent will provide a recall in accordance with the presupposition (if accepted to exist in the first place). The respondent will recall the object or detail.

=== Skeleton theory ===
Loftus developed what some refer to as "the skeleton theory" after having run an experiment involving 150 subjects from the University of Washington. Loftus noticed that when a presupposition was one of false information it could only be explained by the construction hypothesis and not the strength hypothesis. Loftus then stated that a theory needed to be created for complex visual experiences where the construction hypothesis plays a significantly more important role than situational strength. She presented a diagram as a "skeleton" of this theory, which later became referred to by some as the skeleton theory.

The skeleton theory explains the procedure of how a memory is recalled, which is split into two categories: the acquisition processes and the retrieval processes.

The acquisition processes are in three separate steps. First, upon the original encounter, the observer selects a stimulus to focus on. The information that the observer can focus on compared to all of the information occurring in the situation as a whole, is very limited. In other words, a lot is going on around us and we only pick up on a small portion. This forces the observer to begin by selecting a focal point for focus. Second, our visual perception must be translated into statements and descriptions. The statements represent a collection of concepts and objects; they are the link between the event occurrence and the recall. Third, the perceptions are subject to any "external" information being provided before or after the interpretation. This subsequent set of information can reconstruct the memory.

The retrieval processes come in two steps. First, the memory and imagery are regenerated. This perception is subject to what foci the observer has selected, along with the information provided before or after the observation. Second, the linking is initiated by a statement response, "painting a picture" to make sense of what was observed. This retrieval process results in either an accurate memory or a false memory.

=== Neuroscience of false memory ===
Scientific research indicates that true and false memories rely on overlapping neural systems, which helps explain the subjective realism of false recollections from behavioral paradigms such as the DRM word-list task, misinformation studies, and source monitoring experiments, along with neuroimaging research using fMRI and PET methods. False memories arise from normal reconstructive memory processes, particularly when individuals rely on gist-based processing or misattribute the source of information. False memory can be considered as a byproduct of adaptive memory systems rather than abnormalities or errors, arising when individual misattribute imagination, mismatch internal thoughts and external disrupts, and wrong evaluation of memory sources, such as confusing imagined events with perceived ones, reflecting the reconstructive nature of human memory.

== Measuring false memory ==
False memory is commonly studied using controlled experimental paradigms that induce memory distortions under laboratory conditions. These paradigms include imagination inflation tasks, in which imagining a novel event can increase belief that it occurred, gist-based and associative memory tasks, including the Deese–Roediger–McDermott (DRM) paradigm, as well as post-event misinformation tasks, including the misinformation effect, in which misleading information is introduced after an event. These approaches typically assess false memory by measuring errors in recall or recognition, particularly the tendency to report non-presented or misleading information as if it were genuinely experienced.

=== False recall and false recognition ===
Recall and recognition are related but distinct memory processes. Recall tasks involve retrieving information from memory, whereas recognition tasks involve judging whether information has been previously encountered. Recognition is typically less difficult than recall because individuals can rely on familiarity-based judgments, whereas recall requires more extensive retrieval of the original experience.

False recall refers to the retrieval of information that was not actually presented or experienced. False recognition occurs when individuals incorrectly identify novel or similar items as previously encountered. Although false recall and false recognition are distinct forms of memory distortion, both often occur when individuals remember the semantic or perceptual gist of an experience but fail to recall specific details.

=== Misinformation effect ===
Misinformation effect refers to the distortion of the tendency of a person's memory after exposure to fake news and wrong information. Research has shown that memory is reconstructive, and post-event information can be incorporated into an individual's recollection, leading to inaccuracies. This effect is commonly demonstrated through experiments in which participants recall different details compared to previous memories after exposure to leading questions or incorrect descriptions. A 2022 research suggested that exposure to misinformation in digital environments can even further contribute to the formation of false memories, people are surrounded by repetitive and a mix of true and fabricated information on internet. Experimental studies have shown that individuals can generate false memories for fabricated news events, particularly when such information and news is repeated by non-probative images. In the context of the COVID-19 pandemic, the research claims that individuals with stronger conspiracy beliefs were much more likely to recall false memories, presented with the same sources. Analytical thinking has been identified as a potential protective factor against the formation of such false memories, as it enables people to pause for a second, evaluate the resources they have before recalling from their memories.

== Natural factors for the formation of false memories ==
=== Individual differences ===
Greater creative imagination and dissociation are known to relate to false memory formation. Creative imagination may lead to vivid details of imagined events. High dissociation may be associated with habitual use of lax response criteria for source decisions due to frequent interruption of attention or consciousness. Social desirability and false memory have also been examined. Social desirability effects may depend on the level of perceived social pressure.

Individuals who feel under greater social pressure may be more likely to acquiesce. Perceived pressure from an authority figure may lower individuals' criteria for accepting a false event as true. The new individual difference factors include preexisting beliefs about memory, self-evaluation of one's own memory abilities, trauma symptoms, and attachment styles. Regarding the first of these, metamemory beliefs about the malleability of memory, the nature of trauma memory, and the recoverability of lost memory may influence willingness to accept vague impressions or fragmentary images as recovered memories and thus, might affect the likelihood of accepting false memory. For example, if someone believes that memory once encoded is permanent, and that visualization is an effective way to recover memories, the individual may endorse more liberal criteria for accepting a mental image as true memory. Also, individuals who report themselves as having better everyday memories may feel more compelled to come up with a memory when asked to do so. This may lead to more liberal criteria, making these individuals more susceptible to false memory.

There is some research that shows individual differences in false memory susceptibility are not always large (even on variables that have previously shown differences—such as creative imagination or dissociation), that there appears to be no false memory trait, and that even those who have highly superior memory are susceptible to false memories.

=== Trauma ===
A history of trauma is relevant to the issue of false memory. Trauma can distort memory due to the effects of extreme stress. It can affect how the brain encodes, stores, and retrieves information. When traumatic events are recalled, they may be incomplete, altered over time, fragmented, placing emphasis on certain people, places, or events while eliminating others. It has been proposed that people with a trauma history or trauma symptoms may be particularly vulnerable to memory deficits, including source-monitoring failures, or the inability to identify correctly where a memory came from.

Researchers Strange and Takarangi (2015) used an analogue trauma experiment in which participants viewed a car crash video and completed memory tests, including advance warning and written cues, designed to measure source-monitoring errors and false memory. The experiment focused on intentional and unintentional imagery, which can cause new, imagined details to assimilate into the real memory of the event. They found that while participants did not distort noncritical details, advance warnings significantly reduced false recognition. On the other hand, giving participants written descriptions of missing scenes prompted them to mentally reenact these events increasing false recognition rates. The memories of the traumatic event were distorted due to source monitoring failures.

Possible associations between attachment styles and reports of false childhood memories were also of interest. Adult attachment styles have been related to memories of early childhood events, suggesting that the encoding or retrieval of such memories may activate the attachment system. It is more difficult for avoidant adults to access negative emotional experiences from childhood, whereas ambivalent adults access these kinds of experiences easily. Consistent with attachment theory, adults with avoidant attachment styles, like their child counterparts, may attempt to suppress physiological and emotional reactions to activation of the attachment system. Significant associations between parental attachment and children's suggestibility exist. These data, however, do not directly address the issue of whether adults' or their parents' attachment styles are related to false childhood memories. Such data nevertheless suggest that greater attachment avoidance may be associated with a stronger tendency to form false memories of childhood.

=== Age ===
According to research, aging increases susceptibility to false memories because older adults rely heavily on semantic memory rather than specific details stored in episodic memory. Since episodic memory wanes with age, older adults are more likely to confuse related information or mistakenly remember events that did not occur.

Huan et al. (2026) completed a meta analysis analyzing findings from 150 previous studies to examine how aging affects false memory in healthy older adults and people with cognitive impairments. These studies found several factors impact the rate and severity of memory distortions including material and modality, clinical pathologies, underlying mechanisms, and task moderators. The findings in this review show that patients with mild cognitive impairment and Alzheimer's disease have significantly higher spontaneous false memory rates than healthy adults. These results are supported by the principles of the Fuzzy -Trace Theory and Activation Monitoring theory.

=== Sleep deprivation ===
Sleep deprivation can also affect the possibility of falsely encoding a memory. In two experiments, participants studied DRM lists (lists of words [e.g., bed, rest, awake, tired] that are semantically associated with a non-presented word) before a night of either sleep or sleep deprivation; testing took place the following day. One study showed higher rates of false recognition in sleep-deprived participants, compared with rested participants.

Sleep deprivation can increase the risk of developing false memories. Specifically, sleep deprivation increased false memories in a misinformation task when participants in a study were sleep deprived during event encoding, but did not have a significant effect when the deprivation occurred after event encoding.

=== False memory syndrome ===
False memory syndrome is defined as false memory being a large or important part of a person's life. False memory syndrome differs from false memory in that the syndrome is heavily influential to the person's life, while false memory is not. The syndrome takes effect because the person believes the influential memory to be true. However, its research is controversial and the syndrome is not included in the Diagnostic and Statistical Manual of Mental Disorders.

=== Neuroscience ===
The anterior hippocampus has a vital role in forming new episodic memories by integrating information from different senses into a cohesive memory. It is critical for encoding the emotional significance, overall meaning, and associations of an experience that help create a lasting memory that can be effectively recalled when needed. Researchers have conducted studies to show how brain activity during encoding can increase the likelihood of later false recognition.

Vijayarajah and Schlichting (2023) used functional MRI to measure brain activity while 42 young adults completed memory encoding and recognition tasks. The study found that greater activity in the anterior hippocampus during memory formation increased the likelihood of later false recognition, suggesting that this brain region helps create broad memory traces that can contribute to false memories.

== Psychotherapy ==
Therapists who subscribe to the theories underlying recovered-memory therapy point to a wide variety of common problems, ranging from eating disorders to sleeplessness, as evidence of repressed memories of sexual abuse. Psychotherapists tried to reveal "repressed memories" in mental therapy patients through "hypnosis, guided imagery, dream interpretation and narco-analysis". The reasoning was that if abuse could not be remembered, then it needed to be recovered by the therapist. The legal phenomena developed in the 1980s, with civil suits alleging child sexual abuse on the basis of "memories" recovered during psychotherapy. The term "repressed memory therapy" gained momentum and with it social stigma surrounded those accused of abuse. The "therapy" led to other psychological disorders in persons whose memories were recovered.

Putative memories recovered through therapy have become more difficult to distinguish between simply being repressed or not having existed in the first place.

Therapists have used strategies such as hypnotherapy, repeated questioning, and bibliotherapy. These strategies may provoke the recovery of nonexistent events or inaccurate memories. A 2015 report indicates that similar strategies may have produced false memories in several therapies in the century before the modern controversy on the topic which took place in the 1980s and 1990s.

According to Loftus, there are different possibilities to create false therapy-induced memory. One is the unintentional suggestions of therapists. For example, a therapist might tell their client that, on the basis of their symptoms, it is quite likely that they had been abused as a child. Once this "diagnosis" is made, the therapist sometimes urges the patient to pursue the recalcitrant memories. It is a problem resulting from the fact that people create their own social reality with external information.

The "lost-in-the-mall" technique is another recovery strategy. This is essentially a repeated suggestion pattern. The person whose memory is to be "recovered" is persistently said to have gone through an experience even if it may have not happened. This strategy can cause the person to recall the event as having occurred, despite its falsehood.

=== Hypnosis ===
Laurence and Perry conducted a study testing the ability to induce memory recall through hypnosis. Subjects were put into a hypnotic state and later woken up. Observers suggested that the subjects were woken up by a loud noise. Nearly half of the subjects being tested concluded that this was true, despite it being false. However, by therapeutically altering the subject's state, they may have been led to believe that what they were being told was true. Because of this, the respondent has a false recall.

A 1989 study focusing on hypnotizability and false memory separated accurate and inaccurate memories recalled. In open-ended question formation, 11.5% of subjects recalled the false event suggested by observers. In a multiple-choice format, no participants claimed the false event had happened. This result led to the conclusion that hypnotic suggestions produce shifts in focus, awareness, and attention. Despite this, subjects do not mix fantasy up with reality.

== Effects on society ==
=== Legal implications of eyewitness testimony ===
When a person sees a crime occur in person, and recounts what is seen to interested parties, such as police, lawyers, and judges, it is considered eyewitness testimony. Unfortunately, this kind of evidence is often faulty and consumed with errors and bias. This testimony can contain events, people, or details that do not even exist. Over time and under duress, the memory can be distorted and inaccurately influence investigations. This can lead to wrongful convictions and unnecessary injustices.

Researchers investigated methods to reduce eyewitness errors, including double-blind lineups, cognitive interviews, and expert testimony. Double-blind lineups occur when neither the officer controlling the lineup, nor the eyewitness, are aware of who the suspect is in the photo array or lineup. This prevents the officer from offering cues either purposefully or unknowingly to the witness. Opponents of this method worry that smaller precincts do not have enough manpower to conduct this type of lineup and there are not as many identifications or convictions using this method. Cognitive, or forensic, interviews are a method of questioning a witness to improve the retrieval of information from the witness's memory. Four memory improvement aids are used in this process: reinstating the context, reporting everything, recalling events in a different order, and changing perspectives. Although this technique takes more time, it improves the accuracy of the witness testimony, even after the passage of time. Researchers found, through thirty two experimental comparisons using more that 1200 participants, that "across all studies, the cognitive interview increased the amount of correct information that was recalled by 36.3%, whereas the number of incorrect details grew by only 17.5%." This method can be used with both young and old witnesses even after traumatic events. Expert testimony can be used to inform the jury of factors that may affect identification. By educating the jury, it helps eliminate bias caused by inaccurate eyewitness testimony. Many people feel that this is not helpful because it makes jurors more skeptical and more aware of eyewitness errors.

There are real world consequences to false memories that often go unconsidered. In 2013, a California jury wrongfully convicted Derrick Harris of robbery after he was identified in a photo lineup. He served 7 years in prison for a crime that he did not commit. He lost his job, his family, and his reputation in the community because an eyewitness made a mistake in recalling the robbery and his involvement. There are thousands of cases in the U.S. where people are fined, imprisoned, and experience life-altering consequences due to false memories.

=== Legal cases ===
Therapy-induced memory recovery has made frequent appearances in legal cases, particularly those regarding sexual abuse. Therapists can often aid in creating a false memory in a victim's mind, intentionally or unintentionally. They may associate a patient's behavior with the fact that they have been a victim of sexual abuse, thus helping the memory occur. They may then use memory enhancement techniques such as hypnosis dream analysis in the attempt to extract memories of sexual abuse from victims. In Ramona v. Isabella, two therapists wrongly prompted a recall that their patient, Holly Ramona, had been sexually abused by her father. It was suggested that the therapist, Isabella, had implanted one of the sexual abuse memories in Ramona after use of the hypnotic drug sodium amytal. After a nearly unanimous decision, Isabella had been declared negligent towards Holly Ramona. This 1994 legal issue played a massive role in shedding light on the possibility of false memories' occurrences.

In another legal case where false memories were used, they helped a man to be acquitted of his charges. Joseph Pacely had been accused of breaking into a woman's home with the intent to sexually assault her. The woman had given her description of the assailant to police shortly after the crime had happened, and Pacely had been arrested because he matched the description and was nearby shortly after the assault. During the trial, memory researcher Elizabeth Loftus testified that cross-race misidentification is not uncommon (the accuser was Mexican, the defendant was Black) and that stress can impair memory. Loftus has published many studies consistent with her testimony. These studies suggest that memories can be manipulated, and that sometimes eyewitness testimonies are not as reliable as many believe.

Another notable case is Maxine Berry. Berry grew up in the custody of her mother, who opposed the father having contact with her. When the father expressed his desire to attend his daughter's high school graduation, the mother enrolled Berry in therapy, ostensibly to deal with the stress of seeing her father. The therapist pressed Berry to recover memories of sex abuse by her father. Berry broke down under the pressure and had to be psychiatrically hospitalized. She underwent tubal ligation, so she would not have children and repeat the cycle of abuse. With the support of her husband and primary care physician, Berry eventually realized that her memories were false and filed a suit for malpractice. The suit brought to light the mother's manipulation of mental health professionals to convince Berry that she had been sexually abused by her father. In February 1997, Berry sued her therapists and clinic that treated her from 1992 to 1995 and, she says, made her falsely believe she had been sexually and physically abused as a child when no such abuse ever occurred. The lawsuit, filed in February 1997 in Minnehaha Co. Circuit Court South Dakota, states that therapist Lynda O'Connor-Davis had an improper relationship with Berry, both during and after her treatment. The suit also names psychologist Vail Williams, psychiatrist Dr. William Fuller and Charter Hospital and Charter Counseling Center as defendants. Berry and her husband settled out of court.

Although there have been many legal cases in which false memory appears to have been a factor, this does not ease the process of distinguishing between false memory and real recall. Sound therapeutic strategy can help this differentiation, by either avoiding known controversial strategies or to disclosing controversy to a subject.

Harold Merskey published a paper on the ethical issues of recovered-memory therapy. He suggests that if a patient had pre-existing severe issues in their life, it is likely that "deterioration" will occur to a relatively severe extent upon memory recall. This deterioration is a physical parallel to the emotional trauma being surfaced. There may be tears, writhing, or many other forms of physical disturbance. The occurrence of physical deterioration in memory recall coming from a patient with relatively minor issues prior to therapy could be an indication of the recalled memory's potential falsehood.

=== Children ===
Children may produce higher rates of false memories than adults under certain experimental conditions due to underdeveloped attentional and source-monitoring systems.

False memory is often considered for trauma victims including those of childhood sexual abuse.

If a child experienced abuse, it is not typical for them to disclose the details of the event when confronted in an open-ended manner. Trying to indirectly prompt a memory recall can lead to the conflict of source attribution, as a repeatedly questioned child might try to recall a memory to satisfy a question. The stress being put on the child can make recovering an accurate memory more difficult. Some people hypothesize that as the child continuously attempts to remember a memory, they are building a larger file of sources that the memory could be derived from, potentially including sources other than genuine memories. Children that have never been abused but undergo similar response-eliciting techniques can disclose events that never occurred.

One of children's most notable setbacks in memory recall is source misattribution. Source misattribution is the flaw in deciphering between potential origins of a memory. The source could come from an actual occurring perception, or it can come from an induced and imagined event. Younger children, preschoolers in particular, find it more difficult to discriminate between the two. Lindsay & Johnson (1987) concluded that even children approaching adolescence struggle with this, as well as recalling an existent memory as a witness. Children are significantly more likely to confuse a source between being invented or existent.

Shyamalan, Lamb and Sheldrick (1995) partially re-created a study that involved attempted memory implanting in children. The study comprised a series of interviews concerning a medical procedure that the children may have undergone. The data was scored so that if a child made one false affirmation during the interview, the child was classified as inaccurate. When the medical procedure was described in detail, "only 13% of the children answered 'yes' to the question 'Did you ever have this procedure?'". As to the success of implantation with false 'memories', the children "assented to the question for a variety of reasons, a false memory being only one of them. In sum, it is possible that no false memories have been created in children in implanted-memory studies".

=== Ethics and public opinion ===
A 2016 study surveyed the public's attitude regarding the ethics of planting false memories as an attempt to influence healthy behavior. People were most concerned with the consequences, with 37% saying it was overly manipulative, potentially harmful or traumatic. Their reasons against are that the ends do not justify the means (32%), potential for abuse (14%), lack of consent (10%), practical doubts (8%), better alternative (7%), and free will (3%). Of those who thought implanting false memories would be acceptable, 36% believed the end justified the means, with other reasons being increasing treatment options (6%), people need support (6%), no harm would be done (6%), and it's no worse than alternatives (5%).

=== Potential benefits ===
Several possible benefits associated with false memory arrive from fuzzy-trace theory and gist memory. Valerie F. Reyna, who coined the terms as an explanation for the DRM paradigm, explains that her findings indicate that reliance on prior knowledge from gist memory can help individuals make safer, well informed choices in terms of risk taking. Other positive traits associated with false memory indicate that individuals have superior organizational processes, heightened creativity, and prime solutions for insight based problems. All of these things indicate that false memories are adaptive and functional. False memories tied to familiar concepts can also potentially aid in future problem solving in a related topic, especially when related to survival.

== See also ==
- Confabulation
- Cryptomnesia, a memory that is not recognized as such
- Déjà vu, the feeling that one has lived through the present situation before
- Jamais vu, the feeling of unfamiliarity with recognized memories
- Illusory truth effect
- Inception, a 2010 science fiction film dealing with the concept of implanting ideas in sleeping individuals
- Lost in the mall technique, a memory implantation technique used to demonstrate that false memories can be implanted through suggestions made to experimental subjects in which the subject is told that an older relative was present at the time
- Memory conformity
- Michelle Remembers
- Source-monitoring error, an effect in which memories are incorrectly attributed to different experiences from the ones that caused them
- Deese–Roediger–McDermott paradigm, an experimental paradigm used to study false memory
- Misinformation effect, a phenomenon in which misleading post-event information influences memory for an event
