= Jane Doe case =

Child sexual abuse case study

The Jane Doe case is an influential childhood sexual abuse and recovered memory case study published by psychiatrist David Corwin and Erna Olafson (1997). The case was important in regards to repressed and recovered traumatic memories because, being a well-documented study, it had the potential to provide evidence for the existence of the phenomena. The case served as an educational example of childhood sexual abuse and recovered traumatic memory. Elizabeth Loftus and Melvin J. Guyer later expressed serious concerns about its background and validity. The original article appeared in Child Maltreatment in 1997, accompanied by a series of articles by five additional psychologists and memory experts: Paul Ekman, Stephen Lindsay, Ulrich Neisser, Frank W. Putnam, and Jonathan W. Schooler, giving their own comments and interpretations about the case.

== Background ==
=== First interviews ===
Forensic psychologist David Corwin first interviewed Jane Doe in 1984 at age six, to evaluate claims by her father and stepmother, about sexual and physical abuse allegedly committed by Jane's biological mother. At the time of these interviews Jane's parents were going through a custody battle, and both accused each other with wrongdoings such as tax fraud, failing to comply with visitation orders and physical abuse of the children. In the absence of conclusive evidence about these allegations, Corwin was left to decide about their credibility, believing the father's version and discarding the mother's. Corwin met Jane Doe three times as a child, videotaping the conversations with her, using the tapes and transcriptions as the basis of his analysis and evaluation of the abuse. Six-year-old Jane stated on the videotapes several times that her mother repeatedly abused her, but it was evident that this was not the first time she was asked to talk about what happened, raising the possibility for previous suggestions that could have influenced her. She reported instances of digital penetration while the mother was bathing her, and other physical abuse such as hitting her, pulling her hair, and burning her feet on the stove. On the basis of these interviews, Corwin concluded that the mother was abusing Jane Doe, and as a result she lost custody over her daughter, including visitation rights.

=== Second interview ===
The second interview took place eleven years later, when Jane Doe was seventeen. After her father and step-mother separated, she lived with her father until he became seriously ill and died. She was now living with a foster mother, and had some relationship with her biological mother. Jane wanted to see the old tapes because she was having trouble remembering what had actually happened. Corwin interviewed her in the presence of the foster mother. She did not have any memories of the abuse such as the foot-burning episode, but she remembered the interviews and the accusations. However, after further questioning Jane recalled some memories about a single episode in the bathtub, being hurt by her mother. Although still unsure whether her mother intentionally hurt her or not, the memories seemed vivid and powerful. She also recalled accusing her mother of taking pornographic photographs of her and her brother, and selling these. The origin of this recollection was uncertain, as it was not previously documented. Based on the lack of prior documentation, Loftus and Guyer later proposed that the memory was false and induced or suggested by outside sources. During the meeting, Corwin showed the old videotapes to Jane. After watching the tapes, Jane was reluctant to believe that she would have lied as a child, and concluded that her mother must have hurt her.

=== Interpretations ===
Corwin used the videotape and the transcript for educational purposes about childhood sexual abuse since the first interview, with consent given by Jane Doe's father. The second session was later added and consent from Jane was acquired. The case-study was published in the May 1997 issue of the quarterly psychological journal Child Maltreatment (CM), the official journal of APSAC. Several other psychologists (Paul Ekman, Stephen Lindsay, Ulrich Neisser, Frank W. Putnam and Jonathan W Schooler) also commented on the case in the journal, mostly in agreement with Corwin's interpretation, and with some criticism from Neisser and Lindsay. After publishing this article, the Jane Doe case became influential, frequently used as an example in psychology and law, as an evidence for the repressed memory phenomenon.

=== Further research ===
Loftus and Guyer, skeptical of Corwin's evidence, sought to identify Jane Doe through details in Corwin's recordings such as the mention of her first name and hometown. After identifying Jane, they sent a private investigator to her town, tracking down friends and relatives. The research team spoke with a friend of the family who stated "no way did any of the allegations occur." They also discovered that Jane suffered from a fungal condition that caused her skin to peel, which Loftus and her team interpreted to mean that Jane's allegations of foot burns may have been false. They also found a report from a clinical psychologist who stated that Jane's testimony sounded "mechanical and rehearsed," which Loftus and Guyer took to mean that her testimony was not credible. In addition, they found evidence of the father being a problem drinker and abusive towards Jane's older brother.

=== Consequences ===
After the research and the interviews with the family members, Loftus and Guyer decided that Jane's mother did not abuse her daughter and that the case was based on false premises. Jane Doe had been sure that the abuse had happened after meeting with Corwin when she was seventeen and no longer dwelled on the experience, but the investigations of Loftus and Guyer reopened the matter for her. She felt that Loftus was violating her privacy and complained to the University of Washington, where Loftus worked as a professor. The university started an investigation about the research, which went on for nearly two years. Loftus and Guyer were eventually able to publish the case in 2002 in the Skeptical Inquirer magazine.

When Jane Doe found the article, she was disturbed to read what she and Corwin believed were factual errors. First, the article mischaracterized the circumstances of her meeting with Corwin when she was seventeen, stating that he had sought her out to discover "what, if anything" she remembered. Second, it incorrectly said that Corwin had telephoned her foster mother and presented the proposed interview as research. Third, it attributed to Corwin the claim that the case constituted proof of repressed memory. Corwin denied that he had made such a claim, saying that he and his colleagues had presented the case as a question about the long-term preservation of forensic interview recordings and the rights of children to know the basis of decisions made about their childhoods. Jane was further upset that Loftus and her team had not sought more input from her in their investigation.

When Loftus was later asked why she had not sought to interview Jane directly, she stated:

Actually, I-- you know, there were times when I would have liked to have talked to her. I think I even wrote up some questions that I might want to ask her. But in the end, we decided that it was just too risky. ... I just remember there were going to be conditions. And it just made us nervous. And so we decided we would just publish what we had found out through many, many other sources and leave it at that. And that's what we did.

Jane Doe filed a civil suit against Loftus (Taus v. Loftus) and others involved in the research for defamation and invasion of privacy. The case reached the California State Supreme Court, where Jane lost on the grounds that Loftus's article was protected as journalism under the first amendment. Jane was ordered to cover nearly a quarter million dollars in legal fees for the defendants. Because she could not afford the fees, she lost two houses, her car was repossessed, and she filed for bankruptcy.

== Conclusion ==
The two part articles in the Skeptical Inquirer describing the underlying circumstances of the case presented a different picture from the abuse hypothesis published by Corwin in 1997. According to the Skeptical Inquirer, the case ultimately challenged the repressed and recovered memory hypothesis, which was dominant in psychology for years, including the time when Jane Doe's father and stepmother first accused her biological mother of abuse.

The philosophy professor and journalist Eleanor Gordon-Smith studied the case for her book Stop Being Reasonable. Her research led her to question Loftus's expressions of certainty about the case, concluding "there isn't an answer—or rather, there is, and we don't know it. All we have is the evidence that both sides say matters most—and the question, as always, of what is rational to believe."

Jane reviewed the case and the surrounding controversy in an article published in 2014. She concluded: "If I had one wish, it would not be to go back in time and un-file my lawsuit against Loftus et al., and it would not be to refuse to be the subject of a case report; it would be that no one ever be forced to endure such a violation of confidentiality again, particularly not at the hand of a psychologist."

== See also ==
- Repressed memory
- False memory syndrome
