= Taus v. Loftus =

2007 Supreme Court of California case

- Supreme Court of California

Decided February 26, 2007
- Full case name: Nicole Taus v. Elizabeth Loftus, et al.
- Citation(s): 40 Cal. 4th 683, 151 P.3d 1185

Case history
- Prior history: Unpublished, 2005 WL 737747

Holding
- That defendants' course of conduct was in furtherance of free speech within meaning of anti-SLAPP statute; one author's public statements at conference about subject were "newsworthy," and thus not actionable as public disclosure of private facts; statements at conference were privileged from defamation claim; author's use of subject initials in deposition in unrelated case was not actionable; defendants' conduct in obtaining court records was not actionable intrusion into private matters; and subject stated prima facie case of intrusion by alleging author obtained personal information by misrepresenting her association with author of original article.

Court membership
- Chief Justice: Ronald M. George
- Associate Justices: Joyce L. Kennard, Marvin R. Baxter, Kathryn M. Werdegar, Ming W. Chin, Carlos R. Moreno, Carol A. Corrigan

Case opinions
- Majority: George, C.J., joined by Kennard, Werdegar, Chin, and Corrigan, JJ.
- Concur/dissent: Moreno, J., joined by Baxter, J.

Laws applied
- Cal. Civ. Proc. Code § 425.16
- Overruled by
- Implicitly overruled in Oasis W. Realty, LLC v. Goldman 250 P.3d 1115 (Cal. 2011); recognized by Burrill v. Nair, 217 Cal. App. 4th 357, 380 (Cal. Ct. App. 2013), review denied (Oct. 2, 2013).

Taus v. Loftus, 151 P.3d 1185 (Cal. 2007) was a Supreme Court of California case in which the court held that academic researchers' publication of information relating to a study by another researcher was newsworthy and subject to protection under the state's anti-SLAPP act. The court noted that the defendants had not disclosed the plaintiff's name and that Nicole Taus had disclosed it herself when she filed the case under her own name. The court did find that Taus had alleged a prima facie case that Loftus had misrepresented herself during the investigation and that this one count may proceed to trial.

The case involved the initial research of David Corwin into child sexual abuse and repressed memory in 1997. Elizabeth F. Loftus and Melvin J. Guyer were skeptical of the research and investigated the claims that Corwin made. In 2002, Loftus and Guyer published the results of their inquiry, and Taus filed a defamation and invasion of privacy lawsuit the following year.

Having lost on a majority of her claims at the California Supreme Court, Taus settled with Loftus for minimal amount to avoid being liable for attorney fees. Taus remained liable for the attorney fees of the other defendants.

== Background ==
=== Corwin study ===
In 1997, psychiatrists David Corwin and Erna Olafson published a case study known as the Jane Doe case, which became an influential work in regard to child sexual abuse and repressed memory. It was used for educational and research purposes as well as an example in civil and criminal law cases. The study was based on three videotaped interviews conducted in 1984 by Corwin in a child custody case where the father alleged sexual abuse of the then six-year-old child (Jane Doe) by the mother. The study interspersed the interviews with Corwin's analysis and his conclusion that the mother sexually abused Jane and falsely accused the father of sexual abuse. The study also indicated that it had access to and used reports from Child Protective Services, the police, court files and other evaluators. The study also had an interview from eleven years later, in 1995. In the 1995 interview, Jane did not initially remember the 1984 interviews or the alleged abuse. After viewing the videotapes of the 1984 interviews, Jane recalled the alleged abuse more clearly, although there were several inconsistencies. Corwin presented the study as evidence of the recovery of repressed memory.

After the case was published, Elizabeth Loftus and Melvin J. Guyer started an investigation about the background of the case, being skeptical about its validity. Using legal databases and public records, they found the people involved and interviewed them, uncovering crucial information that was omitted from the original study. An example of the omitted information was that this was in the middle of a five-year custody battle, including court actions from the father's violations of visitation orders. Another example was that Child Protective Services had conducted an investigation but had not removed Jane from her mother's custody, nor were there any reports of abuse from burned feet or hospital visits. Loftus and Guyer were also able to document the background of both the father and his new wife (stepmother) and issues that weighed on their credibility. The conclusion of the research indicated that Jane was probably not abused by her mother, and her memories were result of suggestions and coercion by her father and stepmother, as they were trying to win a custody battle against the biological mother.

=== University investigations ===
Even before the findings were published, Nicole Taus, the "Jane Doe" of the study, complained about invasion of privacy to the University of Washington where Loftus worked as a professor. The university started an investigation against Loftus about scientific misconduct and impounded all the files. The procedure lasted twenty-one months, and during this time Loftus was not allowed to discuss or write about the case or give any information about the investigation. Melvin Guyer was also subject of similar investigation at the University of Michigan. When the investigations were over, and the researchers were cleared from the charge of misconduct, the results were published in the Skeptical Inquirer in 2002 in a two part article.

=== Lower courts ===
==== Superior Court ====
The case was filed in the Superior Court for Solano County by Taus in February 2003 against Loftus, Guyer, Carol Tavris, Harvey Shapiro, the University of Washington, and the Skeptical Inquirer. In the complaint, Taus identified herself as a Lieutenant Junior Grade in the United States Navy. Taus sued for infliction of emotional distress, invasion of privacy, fraud, and defamation. The first two claims were filed against all the defendants, fraud was filed against Loftus and the university only, and defamation was filed against Loftus and Tavris only. There were twenty-one causes of action within these four categories. Loftus and the other defendants moved to dismiss the lawsuit on anti-SLAPP grounds, which the trial court approved in part and denied in part. The court denied the motion as to the infliction of emotional distress and invasion of privacy claims for all defendants. It dismissed the fraud action against Loftus, but not the other defendants, and the defamation claim against Tavris. The defendants then appealed.

==== Court of Appeals ====
The case was then heard by the California Court of Appeals, First District, Division 2. The court noted that the debate in the scientific community was on-going over the validity of repressed memory. The court stated that Taus failed to carry her burden as to the tort of negligent infliction of emotional distress. The court ruled that Taus had made a valid claim against Loftus and Shapiro for invasion of privacy. The court also noted that Taus failed to show that the publication of the article invaded her privacy, but comments made at seminars or conferences were actionable. The court stated that Taus did not prove the falsity of the statements published, but that some of the defamation claim (as to Loftus) was still supportable. Again, the defendants appealed.

== California Supreme Court ==
The defense lawyer argued that the suit interfered with constitutional rights as well as hindering research with important implication for public policy. The defendants also argued that the case was a strategic lawsuit against public participation (SLAPP) and offered the defense contained in the state's anti-SLAPP law. Taus argued that she wasn't a public figure and that the defendants had invaded her privacy.

=== Opinion of the Court ===
Chief Justice Ronald M. George delivered the opinion of the court. George stated that the matter was of public interest and continuing debate, and was therefore covered by the anti-SLAPP statute. This left only one claim against Loftus, allegedly misrepresenting herself while interviewing Taus's foster mother. Out of the twenty-one counts, twenty were dismissed, leaving one claim regarding Loftus misrepresenting herself as Corwin's colleague and supervisor while interviewing Taus's foster mother.

== Subsequent developments ==
If Taus lost the last claim, she would have faced a bill of the five years of litigation, which came to $450,578.50, but she made an offer to Loftus to drop the case against her. The lawsuit was settled in August 2007 with an agreement that Taus would withdraw the remaining claim, and Loftus's insurance company would pay a nuisance settlement of $7,500 to Taus. Since Taus had lost the majority of her claims, she was still required to cover the cost of the legal fees ($241,872) of the defendants.

In 2014, a series of articles discussing Taus v. Loftus and its implications for case study research in psychology was published in the Journal of Interpersonal Violence, including articles by Nicole Taus Kluemper, Laura S. Brown, Ross E. Cheit, Constance J. Dalenberg, Gerald Koocher, Erna Olafson, and Frank W. Putnam. The article by Taus (Kluemper) recounts her story of the case and concludes: "If I had one wish, it would not be to go back in time and un-file my lawsuit against Loftus et al., and it would not be to refuse to be the subject of a case report; it would be that no one ever be forced to endure such a violation of confidentiality again, particularly not at the hand of a psychologist."

== See also ==
- False memory syndrome
