= Geoffrey Loftus =

American psychologist (born 1945)

Geoffrey R. Loftus
- Born: December 24, 1945 (age 80)
- Education: Stanford University, Brown University
- Known for: Studies of human perception, memory, legal applications of research in cognition, visual perception, relations between low-level visual and higher-order cognitive processing, and accuracy in recognition memory
- Spouses: Elizabeth Loftus (m. 1968; div. 1991) Susan Loftus (m. 1992; div. 2005) Willa Rose (m. 2008)
- Scientific career
- Fields: Psychology
- Workplaces: University of Washington, Seattle
- Doctoral advisor: Richard C. Atkinson
- Other academic advisors: George Sperling

Geoffrey Loftus (born December 24, 1945) is a Professor of Psychology at the University of Washington. He specializes in memory and attention, and his most recent research focuses on face perception and hindsight bias. Loftus received a B.A. in experimental psychology from Brown University in 1967 and a Ph.D. in experimental psychology from Stanford University in 1971, where his advisor was Richard C. Atkinson. He subsequently completed a postdoctoral fellowship under the mentorship of George Sperling in 1972, and he joined the faculty of the University of Washington shortly thereafter, where he has remained since. He taught at the Massachusetts Institute of Technology during the 1995–1996 academic year. Geoff Loftus was married to fellow psychologist Elizabeth Loftus from 1968 to 1991. They are now divorced, but remain close colleagues. Geoff Loftus retired from full-time professorship in July, 2017, primarily to focus on his legal work. He still regularly testifies as an expert witness.

== Legal work ==
Increasingly, Loftus has been applying his scientific work to issues in human cognition that have arisen in legal cases. He has participated in one way or another in approximately 1,000 such cases. He has testified as an expert witness in perception, memory, statistics, and video-game behavior in approximately 495 civil and criminal cases. He has testified in superior courts in 13 U.S. states, United States federal courts in 11 different cities, a U.S. Court-martial at the U.S. Naval Air Station Sigonella in Italy, and Canadian court in Winnipeg, Manitoba. His work has been cited by the Innocence Project in several of their cases, most notably that of Darrell Edwards.

He has written articles on information loss in the human visual system associated with a witness's seeing someone from a specific distance (most relevant to the Innocence Project work) and visual hindsight bias.
