= Country Walk case =

1985 day care sex abuse case in Florida, US

The Country Walk case is a 1985 child sex abuse case which occurred in Florida and was described as a "multi-victim, multi-offender" case. Francisco Fuster-Escalona, known as Frank Fuster, was convicted on multiple charges and sentenced to a minimum of 165 years behind bars, while his wife Ileana Flores Fuster served three years. Appeals courts at the state and federal level have consistently ruled against Frank Fuster.

Critics of the conviction characterize it as an instance of day-care sex-abuse hysteria. Ileana initially denied any wrongdoing. Following interviews across several months, she testified against Frank and confessed to crimes, later recanting her confession, then recanting her recantation before reversing her account again. Frank has asserted his innocence, and critics of the conviction have raised objections to the case. The case was prosecuted by Janet Reno, and was profiled in the 2002 Frontline episode "Did Daddy Do It?"

== Background ==
Frank Fuster, aka Francisco Fuster-Escalona, had recently married Ileana Flores. They owned the Country Walk Babysitting Service in the Country Walk suburb of Miami, Florida. Frank had been convicted for the 1969 manslaughter of Jack (or Jacob) Isenbek, and in 1980 was shot in the head which family members said led to personality changes. He was convicted for fondling a 9-year-old child in 1981. He pled guilty to manslaughter and does not dispute this conviction, but has disputed his responsibility. In the 1981 sex abuse case he maintained his innocence and refused a plea bargain of 6 months probation. He was convicted and initially sentenced to 2 years probation. Frank regrets following the advice of his lawyer, Henri Rauch, in not taking the stand in this case. Wood et al., who defended Fuster in the Country Walk case, "have no doubt he was rightfully convicted in [his two previous] cases." According to his defense team, his probation officer approved Fuster's working at a day care.

In 1985 he was charged and convicted of 14 counts of child sexual abuse at this day care. He was sentenced to prison with a minimum term of 165 years. The Fusters' victims testified that the Fusters led them in quasi-Satanic rituals and terrorized them by forcing them to watch Mr. Fuster mutilate birds to intimidate any children who might reveal the abuse.

The child witnesses were questioned by University of Miami child psychologists Laurie and Joseph Braga, who used methods that critics characterized as coercive. The Bragas allegedly questioned the Fusters' son for seven hours Critics declared the Bragas "became known as 'the pied pipers of child abuse'". The United States Court of Appeals for the Eleventh Circuit rejected arguments about allegedly coercive questioning methods being relevant to the case. The court ruled the issue had been fully litigated in the original trial, with defense council cross-examining the Bragas and also presenting an expert witness, Dr. Lee Coleman, who outlined possible problems with interviewing children. Furthermore, the appeals court noted: "parents of several of the children who utilized Fuster’s babysitting service testified that their children exhibited severe behavioral and physical problems shortly after attending this service" but before being interviewed.

On the basis of Ileana's allegation that Frank has abused his six-year-old son Noel, the boy was administered a throat culture which found evidence of gonorrhea. Critics note the test was relatively new, and also alleged it was unreliable as "it cannot distinguish [gonorrhea] from [other microbes] that occur normally in both children's and adults' throats", and has "a false positive rate in children of over one third." The prosecutors destroyed the test sample, preventing a retest. The 11th Circuit in 2006 later found Fuster's objections to the gonorrhea test were without merit, as he did not raise a specific Constitutional objection and "does not argue that his son’s test was actually negative". The court furthermore noted the gonorrhea test "merely corroborated other evidence that Fuster had sexually abused his son."

The positive gonorrhea test seemed to have convinced the prosecution of the Fusters' guilt so they sought a confession from Ileana. Attorney Michael Von Zamft had been representing both Fusters but dropped Francisco and critics allege he tried to help Ileana recover memories of abuse. "Francisco's defender thus became his prosecutor." Von Zamft and the prosecution brought in contractors called the "Behavior Changers" to extract a confession from Ileana. Ileana, in 2001, described the "Behavior Changers":

Since they had all the stories from the children and I didn't remember, they will make me close my eyes and just they will tell me the story. They would tell me the story. Then in my mind, I have to go step by step the way how they were telling me the story. I had to imagine that that was happening. ... If I made a mistake, then they would correct me: ... They would tell me the name of the children. I couldn't remember all of them, so they would correct me again. And we would do this over and over until I got the memory piece that supposedly was missing.

Following this treatment, in 1985 Michael Rappaport, of the Behavior Changers, and Janet Reno accompanied Ileana during her deposition against Frank, in which she gave many details including snakes and feces and was periodically interrupted and guided by Rappaport. Sociologist Richard Ofshe studied the case and in his deposition stated:

Ileana Fuster was hypnotized repeatedly prior to trial; that Ileana has personality characteristics ... that indicate a high level of suggestibility coupled with a great desire to please; that the testimony she eventually gave against her husband is likely to have included a great many elements that were suggested to her by therapists in the weeks leading up to trial; and that, as a result, her trial testimony cannot be considered reliable, factual or as historical truth.

She furthermore said that this "leaves 'no question' that [the Behavior Changers] were involved in coercing a confession." Ileana Flores, however, did not admit to such claims when she pled guilty, instead maintaining "that she was innocent but wanted 'to get all of this over'". Ileana served 3 years imprisonment, where she divorced her husband and was "born-again". She was then deported to Honduras, accompanied by members of her new church. The Fusters lost custody of their son, Noel, who did not testify. He went to live with his biological mother and her husband. He has since denied that he was abused. Because Noel denied being abused, he did not share in the settlements, of over five million dollars, paid to the families of the alleged victims in this case by the Disney-owned Arvida Corporation, developers of Country Walk.

Ileana offered testimony against her husband after she had pled guilty but before she was sentenced. She later recanted her court testimony, claiming that she had been kept naked in solitary confinement and subjected to other forms of physical and psychological duress until she had agreed to testify against her husband. Defense investigator Stephen Dinerstein confirmed this, deposing "that the shower, when received, is a hosing down in the cell. That she is in a cell with nothing in it but a light in the ceiling and that she is often kept nude and in view of everybody and anybody." Flores told Frontline that prosecutor Janet Reno visited her in jail, saying "I'm sorry, but you are not [innocent]. You're going to have to help us." The number and timing of Reno's visits are in dispute, with Rappaport claiming at least 30 such visits, and admitting to 34 interrogations of his own. Ileana's interrogations have been described as torture that defense witness Ralph Underwager described as similar to the "psychological torture" of American prisoners of war in the Korean War.

When Von Zamft dropped Frank, it left him with defense attorney Jeffrey Samek. Fuster says that after his 1981 conviction, Samek wanted to handle his appeal, but then Samek found no ground for appeal, which Fuster says prevented his filing an appeal on time. In the 1985 trial, Samek accused Fuster of assaulting him and Fuster accused Samek of lying. Both requested that Samek be replaced, but the judge did not permit this. Fuster later admitted that he "took [Samek] by his clothes and put him against a wall." When Fuster was convicted, Samek said "there is some feeling someone charged with these crimes is guilty until proven innocent. I'm not saying that's the case here." At his deposition, Dinerstein complained that Fuster's defense lawyers were not interested and refused to meet him when he discovered exculpatory information. Fuster's appeal "claim of ineffective assistance of counsel" was rejected as he did not make this claim on time.

In 1995 in Honduras, Ileana gave a deposition to Arthur Cohen, an appeal lawyer representing Fuster, that she could not remember any child abuse "because nothing really happened." A judge ruled that this was sufficient to call for a hearing regarding a new trial for Fuster, and arranged for Ileana to testify remotely from Honduras. Soon thereafter, Rev. Tommy Watson, the minister of her new church that was paying for her education and who had helped to negotiate her early release and deportation, flew to Honduras to meet with Ileana. There Ileana signed a letter recanting her denial, witnessed by Watson. This prevented the hearing that attorneys Cohen and Robert Rosenthal were trying to arrange for Frank. In her 2001 Frontline interview, Ileana changed her story once again, claiming that Watson threatened her into signing that letter. Frontline producer and director Michael Kirk said "The question to me is not whether Ileana is a liar. Ileana is a liar. The only question is when. When she pled guilty, or now?"

As of 2020, Frank Fuster continues to serve a 165-year prison sentence. Fuster and his defense claimed that he rejected a plea bargain of a 15-year sentence that would have released him even sooner. His many appeals and requests for clemency have been unsuccessful, and he has lacked legal representation since 2003.

In 2012, the Innocence Project declined to take his case, telling Fuster, "We have reviewed your case and have determined that our office cannot accept it," with no further explanation.

He will not be eligible for parole until 2134.

Fuster has been attacked five times in prison, and most seriously when a fellow prisoner stabbed Fuster in the neck.

== The Miami Method ==
The case was prosecuted by Dade County state's attorney Janet Reno. Her "Miami Method", to prosecute day care sex abuse cases, was also used to prosecute Bobby Fijnje and Grant Snowden. These cases were profiled in the 1998 Frontline episode "The Child Terror".

Bobby Fijnje, 14 when accused and 16 when tried, was accused of sexually molesting 21 children in his care during church services. The charges were driven by the testimony of children interviewed by mental-health professionals using techniques later discredited. A psychologist told one child, who was denying abuse, that if she made an accusation, "you won't have to keep answering my questions". She made an accusation, while interrogated diabetic Fijnje was deprived of food and confessed to touching a child, only to retract it as soon as he was released. Attorney Mel Black was one of Fijnje's defenders — the church where the abuse was alleged had an insurance policy that paid about one million dollars for Fijnje's defense. Stephen Ceci testified in Fijnje's defense, but also conveyed a plea-bargain offer from the prosecution to Fijnje's family.

The prosecution dropped one of the child accusers before the trial, "so that a jury would not hear her story about digging up graves and a woman turned into a witch." During the trial, the prosecution was unable to present any witnesses to the alleged abuse. Fijnje refused a plea-bargain and was acquitted of all charges. University of Utah psychology professor and defense witness David Raskin said that Fijnje's "refusal to plea marked the crucial difference between the Fijnje and Country Walk cases:

They thought they'd offer Bobby a deal he couldn't refuse. But they were not able to do to him what they did to Ileana Fuster."

In 1997, Fijnje and the Fusters' son Noel attended a "Day of Contrition" conference in Salem, Massachusetts, along with experts and others who had been freed in similar cases.

Initially the charges against Harold Grant Snowden, a policeman, were dropped. Then Reno brought in the Bragas to question the children. Snowden was first acquitted, then retried with younger children and sentenced to 5 life sentences. His state appeals were rejected so he was imprisoned for 12 years before a 1997 federal appeal was successful. In overturning his conviction, the 11th U.S. Circuit Court of Appeals concluded "that allowing expert testimony to boost the credibility of the main witness against Snowden — considering the lack of other evidence of guilt — violated his right to due process by making his criminal trial fundamentally unfair." The appeals court ruled that the positive gonorrhea test, performed by the same doctor at the same lab as in the Fuster case, was unreliable in this case. Assistant Attorney General Michael Neimand argued against releasing Snowden on bail, and letting him speak to the press while they considered retrying him, but the court denied these requests. The prosecution vowed to continue prosecuting, but the U.S. Supreme Court denied their appeal, so they "dismissed the charges on November 22, 1998." Upon release, when Snowden was looking for work, his wife's ex-husband helped get Snowden's name removed from sex-offender lists.

Some attempted to raise questions about these cases when Reno was nominated for U.S. Attorney General: An article by journalist Debbie Nathan in a non-peer reviewed journal edited by Ralph Underwager was faxed to the White House, and Fijnje's father (a Dutch diplomat) "sent a letter to the Senate Judiciary Committee". Raskin argued that the Fijnje case in particular should be raised at Reno's confirmation hearings, but Black was more forgiving and opposed this. Black's view prevailed as Reno was not then questioned about any of these cases. When asked about the Country Walk case while running for Governor of Florida in 2002, Reno replied, "I haven't looked at the file in 15 years; I would need you to bring me all the files, and I don't foresee having the time to go through the files."

== Unspeakable Acts ==
This case inspired a 1986 book and a 1990 ABC made-for-TV movie, both called Unspeakable Acts. The book and early reviews accepted the prosecution's account, but Debbie Nathan criticized author Jan Hollingsworth for leaving out important facts and not disclosing her relationship to the prosecutors: Hollingsworth had left her position as a TV-reporter to become a paid consultant to the Bragas.

The movie starred Jill Clayburgh and Brad Davis as Laurie and Joseph Braga, and Gregory Sierra and Bess Meyer as Frank and Ileana Fuster. But neither Reno nor any of Ileana's other interrogators were portrayed. The movie changed the Fusters' child from a son to a daughter. At the end of the movie, star Clayburgh spoke (out of character) about detecting signs of sexual abuse in children.

The movie and its contemporary reviews accepted the prosecution's (and book's) theory. The New York Times praised the movie for avoiding exploitation and sensationalism, but People Magazine panned the movie as "harsh, sanctimonious [and] painful to watch." Some parents of the alleged victims objected to the movie for reopening old wounds.

== Later discussion ==
In his book The Witch-Hunt Narrative, professor Ross E. Cheit argues most of those accused in alleged day-care sex-abuse hysteria cases or ritual abuse cases in the 1980s were in fact guilty of some level of child abuse, though he agrees many cases were very poorly investigated and is often skeptical of more lurid or sensationalistic claims. Cheit includes the Fuster case in his discussion.

Critics have raised objections to Cheit's findings.

== See also ==
- Day care sex abuse hysteria
- McMartin preschool trial
- Satanic ritual abuse
