= Treating Survivors of Satanist Abuse =

1994 book edited by Valerie Sinason

Treating Survivors of Satanist Abuse:An Invisible Trauma
- Author: Valerie Sinason
- Language: English
- Subject: satanic ritual abuse
- Genre: Non-fiction
- Publisher: Routledge
- Publication date: 1994
- Publication place: United Kingdom
- Pages: 336
- ISBN: 0-415-10543-9

Treating Survivors of Satanist Abuse is a collection of essays edited by Valerie Sinason addressing the treatment of those who allege they are survivors of Satanic ritual abuse. The book discusses the definitions, alleged history, scepticism about the phenomenon and ethical issues related to treating individuals reporting satanic ritual abuse. The book has been criticized by Ralph Underwager for being unscientific, defending a dubious concept with a complete lack of skepticism, possessing the veneer of science without any substance and for promoting unethical treatment practices.

== Publication ==
Publication of the book was chosen to preempt a report by Jean LaFontaine, which had concluded there was no basis to allegations of Satanic ritual abuse in England.

== Reception ==
The book has been reviewed by the International Journal of Psycho-Analysis. The British Journal of Psychotherapy gave the book a positive review.

A review by Ralph Underwager cites the book as an example of the ability of the nonsense humans are capable of convincing themselves of. All contributors are solidly committed to the reality of the phenomenon with minimal skepticism and no evidence. The therapeutic treatments recommended are described as lacking empirical proof and critical analysis, with a veneer of science consisting of a "pastiche" of research and opinions from believers. Ultimately however, they all rely on a series of logical fallacies, clinical judgement and intuition without proof and minimal awareness of the scientific method. Underwager also questions the ethics of the use of these techniques when they are unproven, have high potential for iatrogenic damage, and dubious ties to reality. Underwager does state that it is the best of a mediocre series of books addressing the topic, bringing together all the myriad flaws that comprise belief in satanic ritual abuse, and its appearance as a scholarly volume could fool a person with a lack of understanding of rational thought and logic.

A comment in The Times points out that despite the book claiming a large number of sacrificial victims and animals, no proof has been found (with cannibalism as an explanation), no missing persons reported, no discovery of the elaborate materials reported in the rituals, no medical records of the mutilations endured by the alleged cult members, and no confessions by an apparently large number of witnesses. It also pointed out that reports in the book were from suggestible children and adults who were "helped" with their memories through hypnosis.

Gareth Medway, writing about the book, pointed out that the cases cited by Sinason to support the existence of ritual abuse, aren't particularly compelling, and offers alternative reasons than actual abuse to explain the allegations. Medway also criticizes her sources as not inspiring confidence.

Jean LaFontaine states that Sinason portrays the book as the first clinical, rather than research review of the topic. LaFontaine's opinion is that the book reads more like a rallying of supporters.
