= Winsor French =

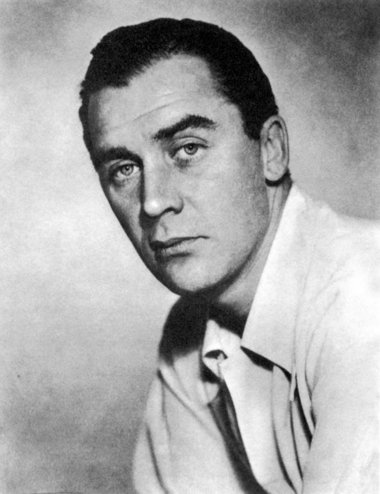
Winsor French

Winsor French (December 24, 1904 – March 6, 1973) was a society columnist for the Cleveland Press.

== Biography ==
Winsor French was born on December 24, 1904, in Saratoga Springs, New York, the son of Winsor P. French (d. 1908), from a military family from Massachusetts, and Edith Ide French. After his father's death, Edith French remarried to Joseph Oriel Eaton II, founder of Eaton Corporation, and the family moved to Cleveland.

He attended Kenyon College but did not graduate.

French started his career at the Cleveland News and Time Magazine, to move to the Cleveland Press in 1933.

In 1933 he married wealthy heiress Margaret Hall Frueauff (she inherited $675,000 ($12,680,070 in 2024 dollars) from her father, Frank W. Frueauff); the marriage lasted only one year, ended in a divorce. She became a noted stage manager as Margaret Perry and married Burgess Meredith in 1936 (divorced in 1939). Perry was the daughter of Antoinette Perry, for whom the Tony Awards are named.

At first a drama editor, he soon moved to the society column. Among his friends: Lucius Beebe, Marlene Dietrich, Clark Gable, Libby Holman, John O'Hara, Noël Coward, Tallulah Bankhead, W. Somerset Maugham, John Steinbeck, and Cole Porter.

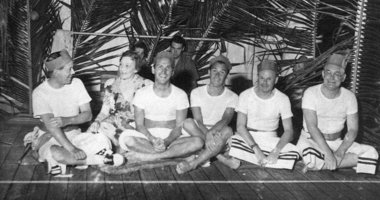
from left: Cole Porter, Linda Porter, Roger Stearns, Winsor French, unknown, Leonard Hanna

In 1936 he spent 6 weeks at the Hollywood home of Cole Porter and Linda Lee Thomas; French had met the Porters through their common friend, Leonard C. Hanna Jr. Through the Porters, he met Roger Stearns, Cole Porter's friend and French's future longtime companion.

In the 1930s he was the first editor from a mainstream Cleveland newspaper to attend African-American nightclubs and report about the jazz culture that was spreading. For a time Winsor French used the pen-name of Noel Francis.

In 1941 he moved to New York City, but at the end of the World War II he moved back to Cleveland and to the Cleveland Press and accepted a position as correspondent from Europe; while there he interviewed Noël Coward, Beatrice Lillie, and W. Somerset Maugham.

He was comfortably wealthy thanks to a gift of IBM stock from Leonard C. Hanna Jr. French's longtime companion was Roger Stearns, a New York Club owner. The couple lived together in apartments in Lakewood and Shaker Heights, Cleveland, until Stearns' death in 1958. Cole Porter etched on an ashtray owned by French "To the lovely loins of Roger Stoins."

After he began using a wheelchair late in his life, he lobbied for the rights of disabled people; he obtained for the Cleveland City Hall and other city buildings to be accessible to disabled persons. Due to his efforts, French received a presidential citation in 1966.

He retired in 1968 and died in 1973. He was buried with his parents in Williamstown, Massachusetts.

== Legacy ==
- Out and About With Winsor French by James M. Wood, Kent State University Press, is the biography of Winsor French.
