= Roger Stearns =

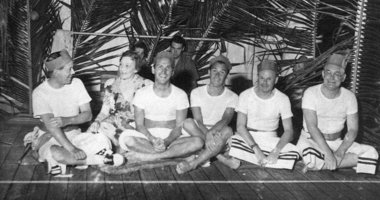
from left: Cole Porter, Linda Porter, Roger Stearns, Winsor French, unknown, Leonard Hanna

Roger Stearns (1902 - February 20, 1958) was a noted pianist and entertainer. According to a journal of the time, he had "a singing voice that out-swoons most of the swoon-singers".

== Biography ==
Roger Stearns was born in 1902, in Dunkirk, New York, the son of Lester F. Stearns.

He attended Yale University and studied architecture. He practiced in New York in the studio of Kenneth Murcheson. In 1945 he designed a new country house for Libby Holman.

He trained as pianist in Fredonia studying under Harriet Bannister and Jessie Hillman. Stearns appeared in many clubs in Los Angeles (Marmont Lane, Hollywood), Cleveland (Statler Hotel) and New York (Algonquin Hotel, Barberry Room and St. Moritz Cafe de la Paix of the St. Gregory Taylor Hotel on Central Park, where other than Cole Porter, a usual patron was Elsa Maxwell). During the Great Lakes Exposition in Cleveland, he played at the Admiralty Club, the unofficial meeting place for the new writers covering the fair.

He was friends with Dwight Deere Wiman, Cole Porter, Leonard C. Hanna Jr. and Jerome J. Hill, who supported him when he opened 123 Club on 123 East 54th Street. Frequent patrons were: Gertrude Lawrence, Monty Woolley, Lucy Monroe, Morton Downey, Charles Boyer, Dorothy Parker, Tallulah Bankhead, Irving Berlin, Vincent Youmans, Dorothy Fields. 123 Club was the first night club to feature the songs from Cole Porter's Something for the Boys, Oklahoma and One Touch of Venus.

Stearns was also a stage actor, his first stage appearance was in New Faces and he was in several musical shows, including Show Boat. During World War II he performed for the U.S. military in The Barretts of Wimpole Street. They gave 140 performances for American soldiers in Italy and France, and then, in 1945, they moved to Boston and other New England theaters and then the Barrymore Theater in New York City. Other than playing a role in the show, Stearns visited hospitals during the day to entertain the men who could not go to the show. The American Theatre Wing War Players was the first all-star war theatre to take repertory overseas. Under the orders from Army Special Services, they played as close to battlefronts as possible. Other than Stearns, actor and musician, the play starred Katherine Cornell and Brian Aherne as main leads, and featured McKay Morris, Margalo Gillmore, Brenda Forbes, Betty Brewer, Elaine Perry, William Noon, Emily Lawrence, Gertrude Macy, Chester Stratton, Eric Martin, Keinert Wolf. They were directed by Guthrie McClintic, who doubled as actor, and Robert Ross, who was both director and musician. Nancy Hamilton and Morgan Lewis were the writers of book, lyrics and music.

He also appeared on stage with Ethel Merman and other entertainers. In 1950 he was lead with Peggy Woods and Joseph F. Moor in The House on the Cliff, directed by Rex Harrison.

Stearns longtime companion was Winsor French, a Cleveland reporter. The couple lived together in apartments in Lakewood and Shaker Heights, Cleveland, until Stearns' death. Cole Porter etched on an ashtray owned by French "To the lovely loins of Roger Stoins." Roger Stearns died on February 20, 1958.
