= Harrison Pope =

American physician

Harrison Graham "Skip" Pope, Jr. (born 1947, in Massachusetts), is an American professor and physician, currently Professor of Psychiatry at Harvard Medical School and an attending physician at McLean Hospital. He is also the Director, Biological Psychiatry Laboratory at McLean's. According to the ISI index, he is one of the most highly cited psychiatrists of the 20th century. Pope's research focus is on substance abuse, especially anabolic steroids, marijuana, hallucinogens, and MDMA. In his book the Adonis Complex, he argues that the media fuels body image disorders for not only women but men as well. He has also written extensively about repressed memory and recovered memory controversy, arguing that repressed memory does not exist. Pope has been a pioneer in designing the first randomized clinical trials of several currently accepted treatments for psychiatric disorders.

== Education ==
- 1969 BA Harvard College
- 1972 MPH Harvard School of Public Health
- 1974 MD Harvard Medical School

== See also ==
- Muscle dysmorphia, the trauma referred by him as "bigorexia", described in Adonis Complex

== Bibliography ==
- Olivardia, R., Pope, H.G., Borowiecki, J.J., & Cohane, G.H. (2004). Biceps and body image: The relationship between muscularity and self-esteem, depression, and eating disorder symptoms. Psychology of men and masculinity, 5, 112–120.
- Pope, H.G., Phillips, K.A., & Olivardia, R. (2000). The Adonis complex: The secret crisis of male body obsession. Sydney: The Free Press.
