= Repressed memory =

Theory that memory may be stored in the unconscious mind

Repressed memory is a controversial and largely discredited psychiatric phenomenon characterized by an inability to recall autobiographical information, usually of a traumatic or stressful nature. The concept originated in psychoanalytic theory, where repression is understood as a defense mechanism that excludes painful experiences and unacceptable impulses from consciousness. Repressed memory is presently considered largely unsupported by research. Sigmund Freud initially claimed the memories of historical childhood trauma could be repressed while still unconsciously influencing present behavior and emotional responses. He later revised this belief.

While the concept of repressed memories persisted through much of the 1990s, insufficient support exists to conclude that memories can become inconspicuously hidden in a way that is distinct from forgetting. Historically, some psychoanalysts provided therapy based on the belief that alleged repressed memories could be recovered. However, rather than promoting the recovery of a real repressed memory, such attempts could result in the creation of entirely false memories. Subsequent accusations based on such "recovered memories" led to substantial harm to persons implicated as perpetrators, sometimes resulting in false convictions and years' incarceration.

Out of lack of evidence for the concept of repressed and recovered memories, mainstream clinical psychologists have stopped using these terms. The clinical psychologist Richard McNally stated, "The notion that traumatic events can be repressed and later recovered is the most pernicious bit of folklore ever to infect psychology and psychiatry. It has provided the theoretical basis for 'recovered memory therapy'—the worst catastrophe to befall the mental health field since the lobotomy era."

== History ==
Sigmund Freud discussed repressed memory in his 1896 essay, The Aetiology of Hysteria. One of the studies published in his essay involved a young woman referred to as Anna O., who had been treated by Freud's friend and colleague Josef Breuer. Among her many ailments, Anna O. had stiff paralysis on the right side of her body. Freud hypothesized that her symptoms were attached to psychological traumas; the traumatic experiences had been repressed from her conscious mind, but reappeared as physical symptoms. Breuer used hypnosis to treat Anna O. She is reported to have gained slight mobility on her right side.

The concept received renewed interest in the 1970s in relation to child sexual abuse and incest. Coming to be labelled The Recovered Memory Movement and Memory Wars or The Memory War, it became a major issue in pop culture during the 1980s and 1990s, connected to Satanic panic, and spawned a myriad of legal cases, controversies, and media. Michelle Remembers (1980), a discredited book by Canadian psychiatrist Lawrence Pazder and his wife/former patient Michelle Smith about Smith's fabricated experiences with repressed memories of childhood Satanic rituals and abuse, gained widespread popularity that persisted after debunking, influenced subsequent claims, and received promotion from media including Oprah, Geraldo Rivera, Sally Jesse Raphael, and 20/20. Starting in the 1980s, repressed memory legal cases increased rapidly. In 1989, a landmark legal case developed when George Franklin was charged and convicted in 1990 for the rape and murder of 8-year-old Susan Kay Nason on September 22, 1969, based on the account of his daughter, Eileen Franklin's recovered memories. Originally sentenced to life imprisonment, a district court judge overturned the conviction in 1995 based on several trial errors including the unreliability of hypnosis that was used. Eileen Franklin would further accuse her father of raping and murdering 18-year-old Veronica Cascio and 17-year-old Paula Baxter. George Franklin was released in July 1996 after prosecutors announced they would not retry him, and in 2018, the DNA evidence linked Rodney Lynn Halbower to the Cascio and Baxter murders. He was convicted of both murders and sentenced to life in prison. In 1991, People magazine featured Marilyn Van Derbur and Roseanne Barr's experiences with childhood abuse and repressed memory. Van Derbur's oldest sister Gwen verified her account, though Barr would later moderate her claims. Such cases and reactions led to the definition of false memory syndrome and establishment of the False Memory Syndrome Foundation in 1992. The Ramona false memory case in 1994 was another landmark case, where father Gary Ramona successfully sued for malpractice against Western Medical Center in Anaheim, its chief of psychiatry Richard Rose, and therapist Marche Isabella, for implanting false memories of child abuse while treating his daughter Holly for depression and bulimia. It was also notable for being brought by a third party not involved in the doctor-patient relationship and contributed to continued evaluation of the phenomenon. Skepticism and criticism of repressed memory continued to mount through the 1990s, 2000s, and beyond, emphasizing unreliability, false claims, and lack of examples in historical records.

== Issues ==
=== Case studies ===
Psychiatrist David Corwin has claimed that one of his cases provides evidence for the reality of repressed memories. This case involved a patient (the Jane Doe case) who, according to Corwin, had been seriously abused by her mother, had recalled the abuse at age six during therapy with Corwin, then eleven years later was unable to recall the abuse before memories of the abuse returned to her mind again during therapy. An investigation of the case by Elizabeth Loftus and Melvin Guyer, however, raised serious questions about many of the central details of the case as reported by Corwin, including whether or not Jane Doe was abused by her mother at all, suggesting that this may be a case of false memory for childhood abuse with the memory "created" during suggestive therapy at the time that Doe was six. Loftus and Guyer also found evidence that, following her initial "recall" of the abuse during therapy at age six, Doe had talked about the abuse during the eleven years in between the sessions of therapy, indicating that even if abuse had really occurred, memory for the abuse had not been repressed. More generally, in addition to the problem of false memories, this case highlights the critical dependence of repression-claims cases on the ability of individuals to recall whether or not they had previously been able to recall a traumatic event; as McNally has noted, people are notoriously poor at making that kind of judgment.

An argument that has been made against the validity of the phenomenon of repressed memories is that there is little (if any) discussion in the historical literature prior to the 19th century of phenomena that would qualify as examples of memory repression or dissociative amnesia. In response to Harrison Pope's 2006 claim that no such examples exist, Ross Cheit, a political scientist at Brown University, cited the case of Nina, a 1786 opera by the French composer Nicolas Dalayrac, in which the heroine, having forgotten that she saw her lover apparently killed in a duel, waits for him daily. Pope claims that even this single fictional description does not clearly meet all criteria for evidence of memory repression, as opposed to other phenomena of normal memory.

Despite the claims by proponents of the reality of memory repression that any evidence of the forgetting of a seemingly traumatic event qualifies as evidence of repression, research indicates that memories of child sexual abuse and other traumatic incidents may sometimes be forgotten through normal mechanisms of memory. Evidence of the spontaneous recovery of traumatic memories has been shown, and recovered memories of traumatic childhood abuse have been corroborated; however, forgetting trauma does not necessarily imply that the trauma was repressed. One situation in which the seeming forgetting, and later recovery, of a "traumatic" experience is particularly likely to occur is when the experience was not interpreted as traumatic when it first occurred, but then, later in life, was reinterpreted as an instance of early trauma.

A review by Alan Sheflin and Daniel Brown in 1996 found 25 previous studies of the subject of amnesia of childhood sexual abuse. All 25 "demonstrated amnesia in a subpopulation", including more recent studies with random sampling and prospective designs. On the other hand, in a 1998 editorial in the British Medical Journal Harrison Pope wrote that "on critical examination, the scientific evidence for repression crumbles." He continued, "asking individuals if they 'remember whether they forgot' is of dubious validity. Furthermore, in most retrospective studies corroboration of the traumatic event was either absent or fell below reasonable scientific standards."

A meta-analysis was conducted by McNally in 2005 to disprove misconceptions about repression, trauma, and memory. The analysis found that a significant misunderstanding with repression is that many individuals who have experienced abuse or a traumatic event often fail to recall these events because they don't recognize the events as traumatic or as an instance of abuse. This issue could arise for several reasons, one being a lack of understanding of what abuse entails, particularly in cases where the individual is a child. Because many of these traumatic events occur during childhood, the victim may not have the emotional or cognitive development to process the event as abuse or trauma. In some cases, the person may not have the language or tools to understand that their experience was harmful. Consequently, the individual may not recognize the event as something to be distressed about at the time. This lack of recognition does not mean the event did not occur, but rather that the victim may not realize the event was abuse until later in life. As they mature and gain a better understanding of abusive characteristics or trauma, victims may eventually come to the realization that their past experience was indeed abuse, prompting them to come forward years later to speak out.

Furthermore, research done by Deferme et al. (2024) on repressed memories emphasized that another reason individuals who experience abuse or a traumatic event don't report their recollections of abuse is due to social stigma. According to Deferme et al. (2024), victims of abuse seldom forget their recollections of a traumatic event completely and they often delay telling others about the event due to shame or fear. They may fear the stigma of being a victim of abuse, whose reports are often denied or criticized, especially if they are accusing a high profile individual. Victims of abuse may also avoid coming forward due to threats from their abuser.

=== Authenticity ===
Memories can be accurate, but they are not always accurate. For example, eyewitness testimony even of relatively recent dramatic events is notoriously unreliable. Memories of events are a mix of fact overlaid with emotions, mingled with interpretation and "filled in" with imaginings. Skepticism regarding the validity of a memory as factual detail is warranted. For example, one study where victims of documented child abuse were reinterviewed many years later as adults, 38% of the women denied any memory of the abuse.

Various manipulations are considered to be able to implant false memories (sometimes called "pseudomemories"). Psychologist Elizabeth Loftus has noted that some of the techniques that some therapists use in order to supposedly help the patients recover memories of early trauma (including such techniques as age regression, guided visualization, trance writing, dream work, body work, and hypnosis) are particularly likely to contribute to the creation of false or pseudo memories. Such therapy-created memories can be quite compelling for those who develop them, and can include details that make them seem credible to others. In a now classic experiment by Loftus (widely known as the "Lost in the Mall" study), participants were given a booklet containing three accounts of real childhood events written by family members and a fourth account of a wholly fictitious event of being lost in a shopping mall. A quarter of the subjects reported remembering the fictitious event, and elaborated on it with extensive circumstantial detail. This experiment inspired many others, and in one of these, Porter et al. convinced about half of the participants that they had survived a vicious animal attack in childhood.

Critics of these experimental studies have questioned whether their findings generalize to memories for real-world trauma or to what occurs in psychotherapeutic contexts. However, when memories are "recovered" after long periods of amnesia, particularly when extraordinary means were used to secure the recovery of memory, it is now widely (but not universally) accepted that the memories have a high likelihood of being false, i.e. "memories" of incidents that had not actually occurred. It is thus recognised by professional organizations that a risk of implanting false memories is associated with some similar types of therapy. The American Psychological Association advises: "...most leaders in the field agree that although it is a rare occurrence, a memory of early childhood abuse that has been forgotten can be remembered later; however, these leaders also agree that it is possible to construct convincing pseudomemories for events that never occurred."

Not all therapists agree that false memories are a major risk of psychotherapy and they argue that this idea overstates the data and is untested. Several studies have reported high percentages of the corroboration of recovered memories, and some authors have claimed that among skeptics of idea of recovered memory there is a "tendency to conceal or omit evidence of corroboration" of recovered memories.

A difficult issue for the field is that there is no evidence that reliable discriminations can be made between true and false memories. Some believe that memories "recovered" under hypnosis are particularly likely to be false. According to The Council on Scientific Affairs for the American Medical Association, recollections obtained during hypnosis can involve confabulations and pseudomemories and appear to be less reliable than nonhypnotic recall. Brown et al. estimate that 3 to 5% of laboratory subjects are vulnerable to post-event misinformation suggestions. They state that 5–8% of the general population is the range of high-hypnotizability. Twenty-five percent of those in this range are vulnerable to suggestion of pseudomemories for peripheral details, which can rise to 80% with a combination of other social influence factors. They conclude that the rates of memory errors run 0–5% in adult studies, 3–5% in children's studies and that the rates of false allegations of child abuse allegations run 4–8% in the general population.

=== Mechanisms ===
Those who argue in favor of the validity of the phenomenon of repressed memory have identified three mechanisms of normal memory that may explain how memory repression may occur: retrieval inhibition, motivated forgetting, and state-dependent remembering.

==== Retrieval inhibition ====
Retrieval inhibition refers to a memory phenomenon where remembering some information causes forgetting of other information. Anderson and Green have argued that for a linkage between this phenomenon and memory repression; according to this view, the simple decision to not think about a traumatic event, coupled with active remembering of other related experiences (or less traumatic elements of the traumatic experience) may make memories for the traumatic experience itself less accessible to conscious awareness. However, two problems with this viewpoint have been raised: (1) the evidence for the basic phenomenon itself has not consistently replicated, and (2) the phenomenon does not meet all criteria that must be met to support memory repression theory, particularly the lack of evidence that this form of forgetting is particularly likely to occur in the case of traumatic experiences.

==== Motivated forgetting ====
The motivated forgetting phenomenon, which is also sometimes referred to as intentional or directed forgetting, refers to forgetting which is initiated by a conscious goal to forget particular information. In the classic intentional forgetting paradigm, participants are shown a list of words, but are instructed to remember certain words while forgetting others. Later, when tested on their memory for all of the words, recall and recognition is typically worse for the deliberately forgotten words. A problem for viewing motivated forgetting as a mechanism of memory repression is that there is no evidence that the intentionally forgotten information becomes, first, inaccessible and then, later, retrievable (as required by memory repression theory).

==== State-dependent remembering ====
The term state-dependent remembering refers to the evidence that memory retrieval is most efficient when an individual is in the same state of consciousness as they were when the memory was formed. Based upon her research with rats, Radulovic has argued that memories for highly stressful traumatic experiences may be stored in different neural networks than is the case with memories for non-stressful experiences, and that memories for the stressful experiences may then be inaccessible until the organism's brain is in a neurological state similar to the one that occurred when the stressful experience first occurred. At present, however, there is no evidence that what Radulovic found with rats occurs in the memory systems of humans, and it is not clear that human memories for traumatic experiences are typically "recovered" by placing the individual back in the mental state that was experienced during the original trauma.

=== Amnesia ===
Amnesia is partial or complete loss of memory that goes beyond mere forgetting. Often it is temporary and involves only part of a person's experience. Amnesia is often caused by an injury to the brain, for instance after a blow to the head, and sometimes by psychological trauma. Anterograde amnesia is a failure to remember new experiences that occur after damage to the brain; retrograde amnesia is the loss of memories of events that occurred before a trauma or injury. Dissociative amnesia is defined in the DSM-5 as the "inability to recall autobiographical information" that is (a) "traumatic or stressful in nature", (b) "inconsistent with ordinary forgetting", (c) "successfully stored", (d) involves a period of time when the patient is unable to recall the experience, (e) is not caused by a substance or neurological condition, and (f) is "always potentially reversible". McNally and others have noted that this definition is essentially the same as the defining characteristics of memory repression, and that all of the reasons for questioning the reality of memory repression apply equally well to claims regarding dissociative amnesia.

=== Effects of trauma on memory ===
The essence of the theory of memory repression is that it is memories for traumatic experiences that are particularly likely to become unavailable to conscious awareness, even while continuing to exist at an unconscious level. A prominent more specific theory of memory repression, "Betrayal Trauma Theory", proposes that memories for childhood abuse are the most likely to be repressed because of the intense emotional trauma produced by being abused by someone the child is dependent on for emotional and physical support; in such situations, according to this theory, dissociative amnesia is an adaptive response because it permits a relationship with the powerful abuser (whom the child is dependent upon) to continue in some form.

Psychiatrist Bessel van der Kolk divided the effects of traumas on memory functions into four sets:

- Traumatic amnesia; this involves the loss of memories of traumatic experiences. The younger the subject and the longer the traumatic event is, the greater the chance of significant amnesia. He stated that subsequent retrieval of memories after traumatic amnesia is well documented in the literature, with documented examples following natural disasters and accidents, in combat soldiers, in victims of kidnapping, torture and concentration camp experiences, in victims of physical and sexual abuse, and in people who have committed murder.
- Global memory impairment; this makes it difficult for subjects to construct an accurate account of their present and past history. "The combination of lack of autobiographical memory, continued dissociation and of meaning schemes that include victimization, helplessness and betrayal, is likely to make these individuals vulnerable to suggestion and to the construction of explanations for their trauma-related affects that may bear little relationship to the actual realities of their lives"
- Dissociative processes; this refers to memories being stored as fragments and not as unitary wholes.
- Traumatic memories' sensorimotor organization. Not being able to integrate traumatic memories seems to be linked to posttraumatic stress disorder (PTSD).

According to van der Kolk, memories of highly significant events are usually accurate and stable over time; aspects of traumatic experiences appear to get stuck in the mind, unaltered by time passing or experiences that may follow. The imprints of traumatic experiences appear to be different from those of nontraumatic events, perhaps because of alterations in attentional focusing or the fact that extreme emotional arousal interferes with memory. van der Kolk and Fisler's hypothesis is that under extreme stress, the memory categorization system based in the hippocampus fails, with these memories kept as emotional and sensory states. When these traces are remembered and put into a personal narrative, they are subject to being condensed, contaminated and embellished upon.

A significant problem for trauma theories of memory repression is the lack of evidence with humans that failures of recall of traumatic experiences result from anything other than normal processes of memory that apply equally well to memories for traumatic and non-traumatic events. In addition, it is clear that, rather than being pushed out of consciousness, the difficulty with traumatic memories for most people is their inability to forget the traumatic event and the tendency for memories of the traumatic experience to intrude upon consciousness in problematic ways.

Evidence from psychological research suggests that most traumatic memories are well remembered over long periods of time. Autobiographical memories appraised as highly negative are remembered with a high degree of accuracy and detail. This observation is in line with psychological understanding of human memory, which explains that highly salient and distinctive events—common characteristics of negative traumatic experiences—are remembered well. When experiencing highly emotional, stressful events, physiological and neurological responses, such as those involving the limbic system, specifically the amygdala and hippocampus, lead to more consolidated memories. Evidence shows that stress enhances memory for aspects and details directly related to the stressful event. Furthermore, behavioural and cognitive memory-enhancing responses, such as rehearsing or revisiting a memory in one's mind are also more likely when memories are highly emotional. When compared to positive events, memory for negative, traumatic experiences are more accurate, coherent, vivid, and detailed, and this trend persists over time. This sample of what is a vast body of evidence calls into question how it is possible that traumatic memories, which are typically remembered exceptionally well, might also be associated with patterns of extreme forgetting.

The high quality remembering for traumatic events is not just a lab-based finding but has also been observed in real-life experiences, such as among survivors of child sexual abuse and war-related atrocities. For example, researchers who studied memory accuracy in child sexual abuse survivors 12 to 21 years after the event(s) ended found that the severity of posttraumatic stress disorder was positively correlated with the degree of memory accuracy. Further, all persons who identified the child sexual abuse as the most traumatic event of their life, displayed highly accurate memory for the event. Similarly, in a study of World War II survivors, researchers found that participants who scored higher on posttraumatic stress reactions had war memories that were more coherent, personally consequential, and more rehearsed. The researchers concluded that highly distressing events can lead to subjectively clearer memories that are highly accessible.

=== Legal status ===
Serious issues arise when recovered but false memories result in public allegations; false complaints carry serious consequences for the accused. A special type of false allegation, false memory syndrome, arises typically within therapy, when people report the "recovery" of childhood memories of previously unknown abuse. The influence of practitioners' beliefs and practices in the eliciting of false "memories" and of false complaints has come under particular criticism.

Some criminal cases have been based on a witness's testimony of recovered repressed memories, often of alleged childhood sexual abuse. In some jurisdictions, the statute of limitations for child abuse cases has been extended to accommodate the phenomena of repressed memories as well as other factors. The repressed memory concept came into wider public awareness in the 1980s and 1990s followed by a reduction of public attention after a series of scandals, lawsuits, and license revocations.

A U.S. District Court accepted repressed memories as admissible evidence in a specific case. Dalenberg argues that the evidence shows that recovered memory cases should be allowed to be prosecuted in court.

The apparent willingness of courts to credit the recovered memories of complainants but not the absence of memories by defendants has been commented on: "It seems apparent that the courts need better guidelines around the issue of dissociative amnesia in both populations."

In 1995, the Ninth Circuit Court of Appeals ruled, in Franklin v. Duncan and Franklin v. Fox, Murray et al. (312 F3d. 423, see also 884 FSupp 1435, N.D. Calif.), that repressed memory is not admissible as evidence in a legal action because of its unreliability, inconsistency, unscientific nature, tendency to be therapeutically induced evidence, and subject to influence by hearsay and suggestibility. The court overturned the conviction of a man accused of murdering a nine-year-old girl purely based upon the evidence of a 21-year-old repressed memory by a lone witness, who also held a complex personal grudge against the defendant.

In a 1996 ruling, a U.S. District Court allowed repressed memories entered into evidence in court cases. Jennifer Freyd writes that Ross E. Cheit's case of suddenly remembered sexual abuse is one of the most well-documented cases available for the public to see. Cheit prevailed in two lawsuits, located five additional victims and tape-recorded a confession.

On August 16, 2010, the United States Second Circuit Court of Appeals in a case reversed the conviction that relied on claimed victim memories of childhood abuse stating that "The record here suggests a "reasonable likelihood" that Jesse Friedman was wrongfully convicted. The "new and material evidence" in this case is the post-conviction consensus within the social science community that suggestive memory recovery tactics can create false memories" (p. 27, Friedman v. Rehal Docket No. 08-0297). The ruling goes on to order all previous convictions and plea bargains relying in repressed memories using common memory recovered techniques be reviewed.

On December 16, 2005, the Irish Court of Criminal Appeal issued a certificate confirming a Miscarriage of Justice to a former nun, Nora Wall whose 1999 conviction for child rape was partly based on repressed-memory evidence. The judgement stated that:

There was no scientific evidence of any sort adduced to explain the phenomenon of "flashbacks" and/or "retrieved memory", nor was the applicant in any position to meet such a case in the absence of prior notification thereof.

=== Recovered memory therapy ===
The term "recovered memory therapy" refers to the use of a range of psychotherapy methods that involve guiding the patient's attempts to recall memories of abuse that had previously been forgotten. The term "recovered memory therapy" is not listed in DSM-5 nor is recovered memory therapy recommended by mainstream ethical and professional mental health associations. Critics of recovered memory therapy note that the therapy can create false memories through its use of powerful suggestion techniques. It has also been found that patients who retract their claims—after deciding their recovered memories are false—may have post-traumatic stress disorder due to the trauma of illusory memories.

== Summary ==
The Working Group on Investigation of Memories of Child Abuse of the American Psychological Association reached five key conclusions:

1. Controversies regarding adult recollections should not be allowed to obscure the fact that child sexual abuse is a complex and pervasive problem in America that has historically gone unacknowledged;
2. Most people who were sexually abused as children remember all or part of what happened to them;
3. It is possible for memories of abuse that have been forgotten for a long time to be remembered;
4. It is also possible to construct convincing pseudo-memories for events that never occurred; and
5. There are gaps in our knowledge about the processes that lead to accurate and inaccurate recollections of childhood abuse.

== See also ==
- Day-care sex-abuse hysteria
- Dissociative identity disorder
- Fake memoir
- Gaslighting
- Interference theory
- Memory inhibition
- Misery literature
- Satanic ritual abuse
- Spectral evidence
