= Elizabeth Loftus =

American cognitive psychologist

Elizabeth Loftus FRSE
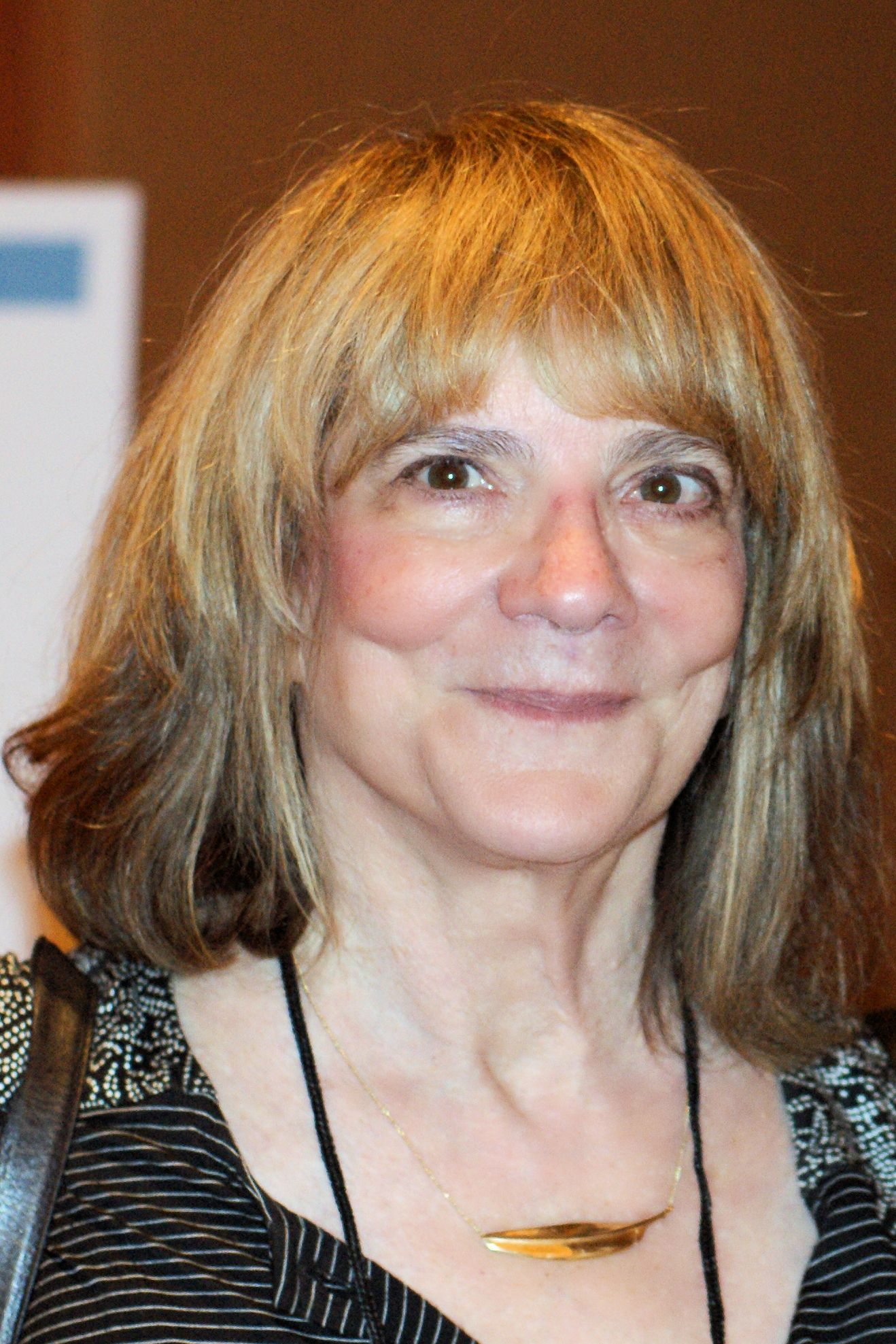
- Loftus at a meeting in Las Vegas in 2011
- Born: Elizabeth Fishman; October 16, 1944 (age 82); Bel Air, California, U.S.
- Education: University of California, Los Angeles (BA); Stanford University (MA, PhD)
- Scientific career
- Fields: Mathematical psychology
- Workplaces: New School University; University of Washington; UCI

Elizabeth F. Loftus (born 1944) is an American psychologist who is best known in relation to the misinformation effect, false memory and criticism of recovered memory therapies.

Loftus's research includes the effects of phrasing on the perceptions of automobile crashes, the "lost in the mall" technique and the manipulation of food preferences through the use of false memories. In the Jane Doe case that began in 1997, Loftus and Melvin J. Guyer revealed serious concerns about the background and validity of the initial research. She has also served on the executive council of the Committee for Skeptical Inquiry and was a keynote speaker at the British Psychological Society's 2011 annual conference.

As well as her scientific work, Loftus has provided expert testimony or consultation for lawyers in over 300 court cases, including for the legal teams of Ghislaine Maxwell, Harvey Weinstein, Ted Bundy, O. J. Simpson, Angelo Buono and Robert Durst. She has also written many books, including The Myth of Repressed Memory: False Memories & Allegations of Sexual Abuse and Witness for the Defense.

== Early life and education ==
Born Elizabeth Fishman on October 16, 1944, Loftus grew up in a Jewish family in Bel Air, California. Her father (Sidney Fishman) was a doctor and her mother (Rebecca Fishman) a librarian. When Loftus was 14 years old, her mother drowned.

She received a Bachelors degree in mathematics and psychology from UCLA, in 1966, followed by a PhD in mathematical psychology from Stanford in 1970, with a thesis on "An Analysis of the Structural Variables That Determine Problem-Solving Difficulty on a Computer-Based Teletype".

== Career ==
=== 1970 to 1989 ===
From 1970 to 1973, Loftus was employed as a cognitive psychologist at the New School for Social Research in New York City, after becoming dissatisfied with university work such as calibrating math and word problems for fifth-grade students. At the time, she had also been investigating semantic memory with Professor Jonathan Freedman at Stanford University.

Loftus was employed at the University of Washington from 1973 to 2001, initially as an assistant professor. She shifted from laboratory work to using "real world" situations of criminal court cases.

Around this time, the United States Department of Transportation was offering funding for research into car crashes. Loftus's first experiment in this area involved showing 45 students videos of car crashes and then asking the students to estimate the speed of the car. Her findings were that the mean estimates of the speeds were 32 mph when the question was phrased as the speed that the cars "collided", 34 mph when the question was phrased as "hit each other" instead, and 41 mph when the question was phrased as "smashed each other". Loftus concluded that "these results are consistent with the view that the questions asked subsequent to an event can cause a reconstruction in one's memory of that event".

In 1974, Loftus published two articles with her observations about the conflicting eyewitness accounts in a particular murder trial and about the reliability of witness testimony in general. This resulted in several lawyers contacting her about current cases, beginning her career of paid work providing advice to lawyers. Early attempts for Loftus to act as an expert witness for these lawyers were deemed inadmissible by judges, however in June 1975 Loftus presented the first expert witness testimony in Washington State on the topic of eyewitness identification.

=== 1990 to 1996 ===
In 1990, George Franklin was on trial for murdering a young girl 20 years prior. The prosecution's evidence included eyewitness testimony from Franklin's daughter that she had witnessed the murder, based on a recovered memory which was unearthed during a therapy session a year before the trial. The defense attorney had a theory that the daughter had never seen the crime and that the testimony was based on a false memory. Loftus was employed by the attorney to provide expert testimony in support of this theory. Loftus referred to an experiment where she showed people video of a crime and then an incorrect television news report about the crime. Afterwards, the viewers had mixed up some events from the original video with those in the news report. Loftus argued that the same must have happened to Franklin's daughter, causing a "memory" of an event that she hadn't witnessed.

However, the prosecutor forced Loftus to admit that she had never studied memories like those of Franklin's daughter. Loftus's studies found that people could misidentify random perpetrators, not that they could mistakenly accuse their own fathers. It was also not proven that memories could be wholly invented, rather than altered. The prosecution was successful and Franklin was convicted, though the conviction was later overturned on appeal and the prosecution declined to retry Franklin.

In 1991 there were several high-profile court cases of people having recovered memories of having been molested by their parents, which gained Loftus's attention. She read through several then-current psychology books (The Courage to Heal) which instructed women and therapists in methods of recovering "lost" memories of sexual abuse, and urging therapists to query their clients about childhood incest. Also in 1991, Loftus was deemed an honorary fellow of the British Psychological Society.

Around this time, Loftus's undergraduate student Jim Coan developed the "lost in the mall" technique. This technique involved Coan giving his younger brother three stories of actual events from his childhood, plus a false story about the brother being lost in a mall. The younger brother believed all stories to be true and provided further details of the false story.

A similar experiment by Loftus found that 25% of subjects believed that they could remember the event which had never taken place; however, this study was criticized by Lynn Crook and Martha Dean based on the ethics of the subject recruitment method used and Kenneth Pope has argued she overgeneralized the findings to draw conclusions about false memories and therapeutic techniques. A later study by Loftus (involving 332 undergraduate students who received course credit for participating) found that approximately one third of students accepted as true a false story about having their ear licked by a drug-addled Pluto character during a childhood visit to Disneyland.

Following the publication of these studies, armed guards accompanied Loftus at lectures. Also, Loftus had previously received death threats after the publication of her 1994 book The Myth of Repressed Memory. The same year, Loftus received an In Praise of Reason award from the Committee for Skeptical Inquiry.

In the 1997 New Hampshire vs Joel Hungerford case, the judge set strict conditions on the admissibility of recovered memory testimony.

=== 1997 to 2000 ===
In 1997, psychiatrists David Corwin and Erna Olafson published a case study of a recovered memory of apparently genuine childhood sexual abuse, which became known as the Jane Doe case. Loftus and Melvin Guyer interviewed Jane's stepmother who revealed that she was involved in building a case against Jane's mother in a battle for custody of Jane. Jane contacted the University of Washington and accused Loftus of breaching her privacy. The university put Loftus under investigation, including confiscating her files. The investigation lasted for 21 months, during which time Loftus was not allowed to share her findings. The university cleared Loftus of breaking research protocols, and Loftus and Guyer published their findings in 2002.

Loftus's invitation to give the keynote address at the New Zealand Psychological Society's conference in August 2000 provoked the society's director of scientific affairs, John Read, to resign from his position and for conference attendees to distribute materials critical of Loftus's work. Loftus stated that she "didn't wear her best jacket" to give her address for "fear of flying tomatoes". Prior to the conference, Loftus was the subject of several internet posts by conspiracy theorist Diana Napolis which alleged that Loftus was conspiring to help child molesters.

=== 2001 to present ===
By 2001, Loftus had become disappointed with the University of Washington's unwillingness to stand by her during the controversy involving the Jane Doe case, and she left the university. The same year, Loftus received a William James Fellow Award from the Association for Psychological Science.

From 2001 to 2003, Loftus worked for the University of California, Irvine, (UCI) as a distinguished professor in the department of Criminology, Law and Society and the department of Psychological Science. She was also a fellow in the UCI Department of Cognitive Sciences and the Center for the Neurobiology of Learning and Memory. Her work included an experiment on 131 undergraduate students in relation to preferences for cookies and strawberry ice cream. The students were given false information that they had become sick from these foods when they were under 10 years old, and were asked before and afterwards to rate the likelihood of this event having occurred.

In 2002, Loftus was ranked 58th in the Review of General Psychology's list of the 100 most influential psychological researchers of the 20th century. The following year, Loftus received the award for Distinguished Scientific Applications of Psychology from the American Psychological Association (APA). Also in 2003, Loftus was elected a fellow of the American Academy of Arts and Sciences.

In 2003, the Taus v. Loftus case in the Supreme Court of California saw Loftus, Melvin J. Guyer and Skeptical Inquirer magazine being sued by Nicole Taus regarding the article they published about her case. The lawsuit included 21 claims of defamation, invasion of privacy, infliction of emotional distress and fraud. Initially, all but one of the claims was dismissed. The remaining claim was regarding Loftus's self-misrepresentation as Corwin's colleague and supervisor while interviewing Taus's foster mother. In August 2007, the remaining claim was withdrawn by Taus, after reaching an agreement that Loftus's insurance company would pay a settlement of $7,500 to Nicole Taus. The following year, Loftus published her studies on the case.

In 2004, she attempted to implant a false memory in Alan Alda on Scientific American Frontiers. Alda did not accept the false memory of becoming sick as a child from eating a hard-boiled egg. Loftus stated that Alda's questionnaire self-correction from "definitely didn't happen" to "happened" supported the false memory theory. The variance in Alda's pre- and post-experiment responses was not stated. Loftus attended and was a speaker at the Beyond Belief symposium in November 2006. In 2005, she received the Grawemeyer Award in psychology from the University of Louisville. In 2009, she received the Joseph Priestley Award presented by Dickinson College. In 2010, she received the Scientific Freedom and Responsibility Award from the American Association for the Advancement of Science.

From 2011 to, Loftus was on the executive council of the Committee for Skeptical Inquiry. Loftus was a keynote speaker at the British Psychological Society's annual conference in 2011.

In June 2013, Loftus presented at the TEDGlobal Conference in Edinburgh, Scotland. She was also the keynote speaker at the 2013 Psychonomic Society annual meeting. In 2015, Loftus received an honorary doctorate in psychology from Goldsmiths, University of London. In 2016, Loftus received the John Maddox Prize, In 2018, she won the Western Psychological Association's Lifetime Achievement Award and the University College Dublin's Ulysses Medal.

In 2022, Loftus made Research.com's list of world’s top female scientists, ranking at No. 451 in the United States.

In 2016, Loftus received the Isaac Asimov Science Award from American Humanist Association.

== The recovered memory / false memory debate ==
Elizabeth Loftus has been an active participant in controversies over memory since the last decades of the 20th century, known as the recovered memory / false memory debate, or as the "Memory Wars" (as in the title of the book The Memory Wars).

Loftus was a member of the False Memory Syndrome Foundation Scientific Advisory Board. She along with Peter Freyd, Pamela Freyd and the False Memory Syndrome Foundation have argued that there is sufficient experimental evidence that people distort their memories, that human memory is not usually faithful to objective facts, and that false memories can be implanted in other people through suggestion and recovered-memory therapy. Thus, the memories of childhood abuse that people recover in psychotherapy, and which are sometimes presented in court, may be false memories.

Other scholars and specialists including Bessel van der Kolk, Lenore Terr, Jennifer Freyd and Linda Williams argue that there are well-documented cases of forgetting and later remembering traumatic events that occurred during childhood or adulthood by people in both clinical and non-clinical populations.

Elizabeth Loftus has argued that the concept of memory inhibition or repression is inadequate and that there is no such thing as repressed and later recovered memories of traumatic events. Loftus criticizes recovered-memory therapy and in particular Freud's psychoanalysis for spreading these inadequate concepts.

Richard McNally argues that forgetting of childhood abuse events can be explained by other factors such as ordinary forgetting or nondisclosure and that the theory of a motivational mechanism for forgetting (repression) is unnecessary.

The Diagnostic and Statistical Manual of Mental Disorders, Fifth Edition (DSM-5) and the Eleventh revision of the International Classification of Diseases (ICD-11) do not use the concept of repression but that of dissociative amnesia. Dissociative amnesia is the forgetfulness due to psychological causes, including stress, of certain autobiographical events, which can cover short or long periods. The DSM-5 includes dissociative amnesia as a disorder (a clinical syndrome) and also as a symptom (among others) of post-traumatic stress disorder.

In 1977 Florence Rush argued that Freud's theory about the Oedipus complex was created to cover up real cases of sexual abuse committed by adults against children. According to this, Freud changed his initially posited seduction theory because he wanted to hide the reality of the traumas that his patients would have suffered. In 1984 Jeffrey Moussaieff Masson published The Assault on Truth, where, like Rush, he argues that Freud covered up the reality of sexual abuse.

Drawing on Rush and Masson, Susie Orbach argues that Freud replaced his theory of seduction and childhood sexual trauma with the theory of the Oedipus complex. Freud changed his views and decided that his patients' memories of sexual abuse were actually imaginary, neurotic fantasies of unrealized events and Oedipal wishes. This change in Freudian theory was criticized by Sandor Ferenczi and John Bowlby among other mental health specialists.

Phil Mollon claims that Freud was ahead of his time and that the new findings on false memory syndrome confirm the claims Freud made a century ago about imaginary memories.

On the other hand, in addition to Elizabeth Loftus, several reputable modern psychologists and psychiatrists, including Ulric Neisser, Julia Shaw and Daniel Schacter agree that human memory is usually not true to the facts.

The book edited by Robert Belli True and False Recovered Memories. Toward a Reconciliation of the Debate (2012) tries to make a synthesis that takes into account the part of truth and reason that both parts have in the debate.

== Involvement in legal cases ==
Loftus has testified in over 300 cases, and consulted on many more. Her legal cases include:

- Robert Durst's 2020 trial for murder: Loftus testified for the defense regarding the killing of Susan Berman.
- Ghislaine Maxwell's 2021 trial for sex-trafficking: Loftus testified for the defense during Maxwell's trial regarding sex trafficking of under-age girls for Jeffrey Epstein. This was the first case where Loftus claimed that the potential for financial rewards could cause a human brain to create a false traumatic memory; when questioned about the basis of the theory by the jury, Loftus stated "I am not aware of any studies on that, but based on my research, it's definitely plausible."
- Harvey Weinstein's 2020 trial for rape and sexual assault: Loftus testified for the defense during Weinstein's trial for sexual assault of two women.
- Lewis Libby's 2006 Plame Affair trial: Loftus testified in a "grilling to remember" on behalf of Lewis "Scooter" Libby's defense, in which federal special prosecutor Patrick Fitzgerald "had her stuttering to explain her own writings and backpedaling from her earlier assertions. Citing several of her publications, footnotes and the work of her peers, Fitzgerald got Loftus to acknowledge that the methodology she had used at times in her long academic career was not that scientific, that her conclusions about memory were conflicting, and that she had exaggerated a figure and a statement from her survey of D.C. jurors that favored the defense. ... There were several moments when Loftus was completely caught off guard by Fitzgerald, creating some very awkward silences in the courtroom. One of those moments came when Loftus insisted that she had never met Fitzgerald. He then reminded her that he had cross-examined her before, when she was an expert defense witness and he was a prosecutor in the U.S. attorney's office in New York."

Loftus has also been involved with the cases of Ted Bundy, O. J. Simpson, Rodney King, Oliver North, Martha Stewart, Michael Jackson, Bill Cosby, Jerry Sandusky, the Menendez brothers and the Oklahoma City bombers.

== Personal life ==
From 1968 to 1991, Elizabeth was married to fellow psychologist Geoffrey Loftus.

== Publications ==
Loftus has written or co-authored many journal articles and books, including the 1994 book titled The Myth of Repressed Memory.
