= Ross E. Cheit =

American lawyer and professor

- Citizenship: American
- Occupation: Professor

Academic background
- Education: Williams College, UC Berkeley School of Law, Goldman School of Public Policy

Academic work
- Discipline: Public Policy
- Sub-discipline: Repressed memory, childhood sexual abuse
- Website: Recovered Memory Archive

Ross E. Cheit is a Professor Emeritus of Political Science and International and Public Affairs at Brown University's Watson Institute for International and Public Affairs.

Since the 1990s, Cheit has cataloged what he presents as cases of recovered memories of child sexual abuse at the Recovered Memory Archive.

== Life ==
Cheit graduated from Williams College (1977, political economy and a coordinate major in environmental studies) before earning a Juris Doctor degree and PhD in public policy at the University of California, Berkeley. Before working for Duane, Lyman, and Seltzer, Cheit clerked for Justice Hans Linde of the Oregon Supreme Court. He joined the faculty at Brown in 1987, and retired from Brown following the 2023 academic year.

For fifteen years, Cheit was a member of the Rhode Island Ethics Commission, including eight years as chairman.

== The Witch Hunt Narrative ==
Cheit reappraised the evidence, proceedings, and media coverage of child sexual abuse cases widely publicized as "witch hunts" in the book The Witch-Hunt Narrative: Politics, Psychology, and the Sexual Abuse of Children.

Anne Grant of The Providence Journal called The Witch-Hunt Narrative "a tour de force against the witch-hunt fabulists and those suggestible enough to believe them". Emile Whitaker of The Sociological Review praised the book's "empirical finesse" and "obsessive attention to detail", but remarked that it struggled "to situate these meticulous findings within a broader critical context". KC Johnson of Commentary wrote, "Even as [Cheit's] book gives every benefit of the doubt to the investigators and prosecutors ... much of Cheit's evidence nonetheless portrays the prosecutions as massive miscarriages of justice."

Volume 32, Issue 6 of the Journal of Interpersonal Violence focused entirely on issues raised by the book. In the introductory article, sociologist Kathleen Coulborn Faller wrote that the book is "well-documented" and ought to be "widely read", but is "repetitive and somewhat strident", as well as "unapologetic in terms of its agenda". Elsewhere in the issue, James M. Wood, Debbie Nathan, Richard Beck, and Keith Hampton criticized that Cheit's work "has omitted or mischaracterized important facts or ignored relevant scientific information" and "is often factually inaccurate and tends to make strong assertions without integrating relevant scholarly and scientific information." In another article, FBI child sexual abuse expert Kenneth Lanning wrote,

I agree with much of what Cheit sets forth in his book about seeds of truth in many of the cases. I do not have the time or resources to dispute any significant amount of his time-consuming and admirable case-based research. However, in a few instances (e.g., the Nassau County District Attorney’s 2013 Friedman case “Conviction Integrity Review”), I am very familiar with certain details and disagree with some aspects of his conclusions.

Lanning also criticized Cheit's imprecise use of terminology such as witch-hunt, and argues that "more benefit could have come had Cheit's book and extensive research focused more on documenting how some allegations became so bizarre and inaccurate".

== See also ==
- Satanic panic
