= George Sperling =

American cognitive psychologist

- Born: 1934 (age 91–92)
- Education: University of Michigan, Columbia University, Harvard University
- Known for: Research in Cognitive Psychology, Iconic Memory

George Sperling (born 1934) is an American cognitive psychologist, researcher, and educator. Sperling documented the existence of iconic memory (one of the sensory memory subtypes). Through several experiments, he showed support for his hypothesis that human beings store a perfect image of the visual world for a brief moment, before it is discarded from memory. He was in the forefront in wanting to help the deaf population in terms of speech recognition. He argued that the telephone was created originally for the hearing impaired but it became popularized by the hearing community. He suggested with a sevenfold reduction in the bandwidth for video transmission, it can be useful for the improvement in American Sign Language communication. Sperling used a method of partial report to measure the time course of visual persistence (sensory memory).

He is a Distinguished Professor of both Cognitive Science and Neurobiology & Behavior at the University of California, Irvine.

== Education ==
In 1955, George Sperling graduated with a B.S. degree at the University of Michigan with hopes to become a scientist in one of the major scientific field such as biology, chemistry, mathematics, and physics. In 1956, he went on to receive an M.A. degree in psychology from Columbia University. His passion for physiological psychology began accidentally in university and caused him to pursue a career in cognitive psychology. He received his Ph.D. from Harvard University in 1959, and his thesis paper was focused on short-term memory.

== Career ==
In summer 1958, Sperling went to work at Bell Laboratories where numerous experiments were conducted. Sperling was originally attracted to psychology because he wanted to apply quantitative methods and theories used by physicists to describe the brain's mental microprocesses.

In the early 1960s, George Sperling proposed a method of measuring visual persistence duration in which the subject judged the synchrony of a click and the onset / termination of a light. This method was further innovated by with Erich Weichselgartner so that the entire rise and fall of the temporal brightness function was also measured, contrasting the initial method that only measured the moment and which visual persistence stopped.

Throughout Sperling's career, he has contributed very much to the fields of visual information processing and theory and empirical research. In 1960, Sperling performed an experiment using a matrix with three rows of three letters. Participants of the study were asked to look at the letters, for a brief period of time, and then recall them immediately afterwards. This technique, called free recall, showed that participants were able to, on average, recall 4–5 letters of the 9 they were given. This however, was already generally accepted in the psychological community, because it was understandable that people simply could not retain all the letters in their mind in such a brief period of time. Sperling, on the other hand, felt that they had encoded all of the letters in their mind, but had simply forgotten them while trying to recall this information on what they had seen. He believed that all nine letters were stored in the viewer's memory for a short period of time, but the memory failed leading to only 4 or 5 being recalled. Sperling called this iconic memory. This was exemplified through Sperling's Iconic Memory Test, which involves having a grid of letters being flashed for 1/20 of a second. If individuals were prompted to recall a particular row immediately after the grid was shown, opposed to being asked to recall the entire grid, participants experienced higher accuracy. This procedure demonstrated that although iconic memory can store the whole grid, information tends to fade away too rapidly for a person to recall all of the information. Sperling also showed this with his experiment of cued recall. This trial was similar to free recall; however, instead of allowing participants to recall any of the letters, it would allow them to view the same matrix for the same amount of time, and then hear a pitch corresponding to a different row in the matrix. The viewer was to recall the letters in that corresponding row. On average, viewers were able to recall more during cued recall trials than free recall.

Sperling built upon this experiment to then determine the amount of time before information was discarded from a person's memory. Using the same matrix, allowing viewers to see the matrix for the same amount of time, and still giving the pitches to cue the viewer which row to recall, Sperling added a twist: there would be a 5-millisecond delay after the letters disappeared before the cue would appear. The participants were unable to recall as many letters, thus showing that visual stimuli that are not added to short-term memory are discarded less than 5 milliseconds of initial introduction. (It was later agreed upon that most visual icons are eliminated from memory before 250 milliseconds.)

Sperling has lectured at Stanford University, University of Washington, University of Western Australia, University of London, University of California: Los Angeles, Columbia University, Duke University and New York University. He was elected a Fellow of the American Academy of Arts and Sciences in 1992.

== Publications ==
Sperling's first publication, "Negative Afterimages Without Prior Positive Images," was in visual psychophysics. He then went on to publish mathematical models for adaptation and flicker, contrast detection, binocular vision, and motion perception.

=== Select representative publications ===
- Sperling, George (1963). "A model for visual memory tasks". Human Factors. 5: 19–31. doi:10.1177/001872086300500103. PMID 13990068. S2CID 5347138.
- Sperling, George; Novak, Stanley (1963). "Visual thresholds near a continuously visible or briefly presented light-dark boundary". Optica Acta. 10 (2): 187–191. Bibcode:1963AcOpt..10..187.. doi:10.1080/713817782. PMID 14051029.
- Sperling, George (1967). "Successive approximations to a model for short term memory". Acta Psychologica. 27: 285–292. doi:10.1016/0001-6918(67)90070-4. PMID 6062221.
- Sperling, George; Novak, Stanley (1967). "Increment Thresholds". Journal of the Optical Society of America (Letter). 57 (4): 542–3. doi:10.1364/JOSA.57.000542. PMID 6027834 – via OSA Publishing, The Optical Society.
- 1968 Sperling, G., & Sondhi, M. M. (1968). Model for visual luminance discrimination and flicker detection. Journal of the Optical Society of America, 58, 1133–1145.
- 1984 van Santen, J. P. H., & Sperling, G. (1984). Temporal covariance model of human motion perception. Journal of the Optical Society of America A: Optics and Image Science, 1, 451–473.
- 1985 van Santen, J. P. H., & Sperling, G. (1985). Elaborated Reichardt detectors. Journal of the Optical Society of America A: Optics and Image Science, 2, 300–321.
- Sperling, George; Chubb, Charles (1988). "Drift-balanced random stimuli: a general basis for studying non-Fourier motion perception". Journal of the Optical Society of America A. 5 (11): 1986–2007. Bibcode:1988JOSAA...5.1986C. CiteSeerX 10.1.1.324.3078. doi:10.1364/JOSAA.5.001986. PMID 3210090 – via OSA Publishing, The Optical Society.

== See also ==
- Iconic memory
