= David Corwin =

American psychiatrist

David L. Corwin is a board-certified psychiatrist, child and adolescent psychiatrist, and forensic psychiatrist. Corwin has done extensive work into the long-term impact of child violence and abuse on health, and has promoted family support and treatment programs. Corwin has worked as a consultant, a lecturer, a trainer, and an evaluator of suspected or known child sexual abuse cases throughout many countries, as well as serving as an expert witness of child sexual abuse cases. Corwin has founded, directed or chaired groups that serve to advance prevention and protection against child violence and abuse, as well as furthering the education and research of the impact of child abuse.

== Biography ==
=== Education ===
Corwin received a B.S degree at the University of Michigan, followed by receiving an M.D. at the Michigan State College of Human Medicine. Corwin completed an internship in psychiatry and internal medicine and then a psychiatry residency at UCLA-VA Medical Center. Corwin completed a fellowship in child psychiatry at the UCLA Neuropsychiatric Institute, and then certificates in executive leadership, advanced training in continuous quality improvement and conflict resolution at the University of Utah and Intermountain Healthcare.

=== Career ===
Corwin inspired and chaired the National Summit Conference meeting in Los Angeles in 1985 about how to diagnose child sexual abuse. A consequence of the conference was the formation of the group that founded the American Professional Society on the Abuse of Children (APSAC) in 1986 which Corwin chaired and later served as a member of APSAC's BOD. In the same year that he chaired the organizing committee for APSAC, Corwin founded the California Professional Society on the Abuse of Children (CAPSAC). The aim of APSAC is to promote the best possible professional response for children and families at risk of maltreatment APSAC regularly publishes the newsletter APSAC Advisor and the journal Child Maltreatment which inform professionals in a range of disciplines about the latest policies, research findings, and up to date information on child maltreatment. Corwin was awarded Outstanding Service in 1993 and Outstanding Professional of the Year in 2007 by APSAC.

Corwin co-directed the UCLA Family Support Program for treatment of intra-familial child sexual abuse from 1980 to 1982. During his time at UCLA, he initiated and chaired the Los Angeles Task Force on interviewing sexually abused children which was the first to recommend nationally and internationally (Washington D.C. and Paris, 1982) the video recording of investigative and evaluative interviews with children in possible sexual abuse cases. Starting in 1999 he served as medical director of Primary Children's Medical Center's Safe and Healthy Families Department and later Chief of the Pediatrics Child Protection Division until August 1, 2012. Corwin has served as an expert witness and evaluated, trained, consulted and lectured on suspected or known cases of child sexual abuse throughout many countries and regions over the last 30 years, including Thailand, Canada, the United States, Europe, Israel, South Korea, and Great Britain.

Corwin served as liaison for the American Academy of Child and Adolescent Psychiatry, from 2001 to 2009 to the AMA's National Advisory Council on Violence and Abuse of which he was its last Steering Committee Chair and oversaw its transformation, into the National Health Collaborative on Violence and Abuse for which he served as the first chair.

Corwin also helped found and serves as president for the Academy on Violence and Abuse from 2013 to 2015, which is an interprofessional international membership society that promotes research and education about the health effects of violence and abuse. Corwin is also a founder of the Helfer Society, which is named after one of his first faculty preceptors at Michigan State University College of Human Medicine, Ray E. Helfer, MD. The Helfer Society is an honorary society for physicians who focus their work on child abuse. Corwin was chosen as a national leading child abuse physician in 2006 and invited to join the Whitworth Seniors Forum, a small group of physician leaders focusing on child abuse policy. The Child Abuse Research Education and Services (CARES) Network is a proposal to establish a nationwide network of consortia of excellence dedicated to training, research and improving the ability of the healthcare system to identify, treat and prevent child abuse. The CARES Network, conceived and promoted by Drs. Randall Alexander, John Stirling and Corwin was endorsed by the American Academy of Child and Adolescent Psychiatry, the American Academy of Pediatrics and the National Association of Children's Hospitals and Related Institutions but to this dated never funded by Congress.

Corwin currently works as a professor and director of forensic services for the Pediatrics Department at the University of Utah. He has a continuing interest in improving services and awareness about the adverse health impacts of violence and abuse across the lifespan. Corwin also continues to serve as an expert witness, consultant and forensic evaluator. He has produced three DVDs including the 2012 Academy on Violence and Abuse DVD featuring Drs. Felitti, Anda and Putnam.

== The Jane Doe case ==
In 1997 Corwin published an article in the journal Child Maltreatment about "Jane Doe"; a young girl who in 1984 along with her parents were referred to Corwin for a court-appointed forensic evaluation, as mutually agreed by all parties involved in family court litigation regarding custody and visitation, after she disclosed that she had been sexually abused by her mother after the parents separated. Corwin videotaped his interviews with Jane, then five and six years old, the third and last interview of which a verbatim transcript, history, and discussion of the case are documented in the 1997 publication. Corwin had previously concluded that Jane had been sexually abused by her mother, and her father was granted custody rights while the mother eventually lost even the right to visitation. Ten years after the court-appointed and video recorded evaluation, Jane was contacted again by Corwin to reaffirm her assent for his use of the earlier video recorded interview for professional education and she requested to view her forensic evaluation interviews to help her remember what she had told Corwin, since she could not remember the experiences she earlier described. A year later, after her father's death, Corwin met with Jane and videotaped the informed consent with Jane prior to showing her the earlier video recorded interviews. Jane was 17 years old at that time. During the videotaped informed consent, Jane appears to recall the memory of sexual abuse, but also described events for which there was no previous documentation. Five commentaries follow Corwin's 1997 article, which discuss various aspects of the Jane Doe case such as Jane's expressive behaviour during her interviews and implications of the recollection of the abuse that Jane previously hadn't remembered. Although some researchers hailed Jane's recollection as an example of "repressed memory", Elizabeth Loftus was sceptical about the truth surrounding the alleged abuse and investigated Jane Doe's case, concluding that Jane had never been abused by the mother. Jane Doe, who then revealed herself as Nicole Taus, sued Loftus and lengthy litigation took place.
