= Ralph Underwager =

American minister and psychologist (1929–2003)

Ralph Charles Underwager

Personal life
- Born: July 29, 1929 Elgin, Illinois, U.S.
- Died: November 29, 2003 (aged 74) Northfield, Minnesota, U.S.
- Education: Concordia Seminary; Minnesota University

Religious life
- Religion: Christianity
- Denomination: Lutheranism

Ralph Charles Underwager (28 July 1929 – 29 November 2003) was an American minister and psychologist who rose to prominence as a defense witness for adults accused of child sexual abuse in the 1980s and 1990s. Until he died in 2003, he served as the director of the Institute for Psychological Therapies, which he had founded in 1974. He was also a founder of Victims of Child Abuse Laws (VOCAL), a lobby group which represented the interests of parents whose children had been removed from their care by social services following abuse allegations. He was a founding member of the False Memory Syndrome Foundation. He was also accused of being a supporter of pedophilia because of controversial statements he made, including those in an interview to Paidika: The Journal of Paedophilia. He was heard as an expert witness at least until 1997.

== Biography ==
He was born on 28 July 1929. He earned a Master of Divinity from Concordia Seminary of St. Louis in 1951 and a Ph.D. from the University of Minnesota in 1970. He was a pastor of Lutheran Churches in Iowa and Minnesota. He became the director of the Institute for Psychological Therapies in Northfield, Minnesota in 1974. He died on 29 November 2003.

== Founder of VOCAL ==
Underwager first appeared in court as a defense witness for two of the accused in the 1984 Jordan, Minnesota case, one of the earliest attempts to prosecute alleged organized child sexual abuse in the United States. On the stand, Underwager argued that the children's testimony of abuse was the result of brainwashing by social workers using Communist thought-reform techniques. The accused couple were acquitted, and they joined with Underwager to form VOCAL, a lobby group for people who had been accused of child abuse by social services.

Within a year of its establishment, VOCAL claimed 3000 members in 100 chapters across America. VOCAL members picketed hospitals, courts, and social service departments whom they characterized as staffed by "Gestapo-like" "fanatics", "quacks and zealots" who remove children solely based on "rumours". Throughout the 1980s and 1990s, VOCAL made several attempts to have legislation passed that would limit the powers of child protection services. Nationally, VOCAL campaigned to lift the burden of proof in child protection cases to a criminal standard. In Florida, VOCAL lobbied to restrict mandatory reporting requirements. VOCAL criticized child abuse prevention programs, claiming that they create sexually aware children who might misinterpret an innocent touch from an adult.

== Career as a defense witness ==
Underwager was a prolific defense expert for people accused of child sexual abuse. By the late 1980s, he had appeared in court on behalf of defendants in child sexual abuse cases more than 200 times in the US, Canada, Australia, New Zealand and Britain. In court and in the media, Underwager was reported as saying that 60% of women sexually abused in childhood reported that the experience was good for them, but in his own writing claimed to have been misinterpreted and that such abuse is always harmful. He characterized child protection investigations as nothing less than an "assault on the family as an institution" and he alleged that 75% of mothers alleging sexual abuse in custody proceedings suffered from a "severe personality disorder" that prompted them to manufacture false allegations. He claimed that forensic interviews with children inevitably lead the child to confabulate an account of satanic ritual abuse because the "fantasy world of children is filled with mayhem, murder, cannibalism, blood and gore." He claimed that all forensic interviews with children provoked this sadistic sexual fantasy life, creating "psychotic" and sexualized children who were "ruined for life."

Psychologist Anna Salter argued that Underwager and Hollida Wakefield's claims as outlined above demonstrated "systematic misrepresentations" of reputable research, and often that Underwager and Wakefield made claims contrary to their sources. Underwager later filed several unsuccessful suits against Salter who claims that it was in retaliation for her criticism of Underwager's courtroom testimony and for claiming he lied in order to help child molesters evade punishment. Salter also claimed Underwager engaged in other threatening actions.

Guy Stockwell portrayed Underwager's role as a defense witness in the Country Walk case in the TV-movie Unspeakable Acts.

== Interview controversy ==
Underwager was forced to resign from the advisory board of the False Memory Syndrome Foundation because of an article that appeared in "Moving Forward: A Newsjournal for Adult Survivors of Childhood Sexual Abuse and Their Supporters", a series of excerpts from an interview he and Hollida Wakefield—his wife and also an FMFS advisory board member—had given to a non-refereed, pro-pedophilia pseudo-academic publication, Paidika: The Journal of Paedophilia. In the Paidika interview Underwager was asked "Is choosing paedophilia for you a responsible choice for the individual?", Underwager responded,

Certainly it is responsible. What I have been struck by as I have come to know more about and understand people who choose paedophilia is that they let themselves be too much defined by other people. That is usually an essentially negative definition. Paedophiles spend a lot of time and energy defending their choice. I don't think that a paedophile needs to do that. Paedophiles can boldly and courageously affirm what they choose. They can say that what they want is to find the best way to love. I am also a theologian and as a theologian, I believe it is God's will that there be closeness and intimacy, unity of the flesh, between people. A paedophile can say: "This closeness is possible for me within the choices that I've made." Paedophiles are too defensive. They go around saying, "You people out there are saying that what I choose is bad, that it's no good. You're putting me in prison, you're doing all these terrible things to me. I have to define my love as being in some way or other illicit." What I think is that paedophiles can make the assertion that the pursuit of intimacy and love is what they choose. With boldness, they can say, "I believe this is in fact part of God's will." They have the right to make these statements for themselves as personal choices. Now whether or not they can persuade other people they are right is another matter.

Underwager and his wife claimed that their comments were in the context of their view that the best prevention programs for sex-abuse of children were those that focused on stopping the actions of abusers. Underwager later claimed that "radical feminists who have self-styled themselves as sex-abuse experts" had taken the interview out of context and misrepresented his answers, reiterating previous statements that he believed "sexual contact between an adult and a child is [n]ever acceptable nor can it ever be positive." In the Paidika interview, Wakefield asserted that such relationships could be "neutral" in the US, may be positive elsewhere, and that positive effects were seen in some studies but were censored by the academic press. Underwager and Wakefield would specifically state that sexual contact between adults and children is always harmful in their 1994 book Return of the Furies.
