= False Memory Syndrome Foundation =

Defunct American nonprofit organization

- Founded: March 1992
- Founder: Pamela and Peter Freyd
- Dissolved: 2019
- Type: 501(c)(3)
- Purpose: To seek the reasons for the spread of false memory syndrome, to work for ways to prevent it, to aid those who were affected by it and to bring their families into reconciliation
- Location: Philadelphia, Pennsylvania, U.S.
- Key people: Pamela Freyd, PhD – Executive Director
- Website: Official website

The False Memory Syndrome Foundation (FMSF) was a nonprofit organization founded in 1992 and dissolved in late 2019. The FMSF was created by Pamela and Peter Freyd, after their adult daughter Jennifer Freyd accused her father of sexual abuse when she was a child.

The FMSF described its purpose as the examination of the concept of false memory syndrome and recovered memory therapy and advocacy on behalf of individuals believed to be falsely accused of child sexual abuse. This focus included preventing future incidents, helping individuals and reconciling families affected by FMS, publicizing information about FMS, sponsoring research on it and discovering methods to distinguish true and false memories of abuse. This initial group was composed of academics and professionals and the organization sought out researchers in the fields of memory and clinical practice to form its advisory board. The goal of the FMSF expanded to become more than an advocacy organization, also attempting to address the issues of memory that seemed to have caused the behavioral changes in their now-adult children.

Mike Stanton in the Columbia Journalism Review stated that the FMSF "helped revolutionize the way the press and the public view one of the angriest debates in America—whether an adult can suddenly remember long-forgotten childhood abuse". The FMSF originated and popularized the term false memory syndrome to describe a "pattern of beliefs and behaviors" which followed after participation in therapy intended to recover previously unknown memories. The term recovered memory therapy was, in turn, originated as a catch-all term for the types of therapies that were used to attempt to recover memories, and observed to create false memories. False memory syndrome is not included in the Diagnostic and Statistical Manual of Mental Disorders, as it is not a psychiatric diagnosis or illness, but it is included in public advisory guidelines relating to mental health. The foundation believed that false memories devalued the tragedy of real abuse.

== History ==
Founded in March 1992 by Pamela and Peter Freyd, after their thirty-three-year-old daughter Jennifer Freyd accused her father of sexually abusing her as a teenager. The parents believed that their daughter's memories of abuse were due to a therapist who had influenced fabricated remembrances of abuse when Jennifer sought out therapy for her anxiety attacks over an upcoming Christmas family visit.

The accusations between the family members escalated after Pamela Freyd published an article in 1991 titled “How Could This Happen? Coping with a False Accusation of Incest and Rape” in the journal Issues in Child Abuse Accusations. Pamela Freyd used the name Jane Doe but details made it obvious who really was responsible, thus outing daughter Jennifer Freyd. The parents decided to form the organization False Memory Syndrome Foundation (FMSF) out of their home in Center City Philadelphia.

The term false memory syndrome was coined to define a set of behaviours and actions resulting from false memories of trauma and sexual abuse. The memories are recovered as an adult, usually during therapy and contested by the person accused. This pattern furthered the need to incorporate in order to provide research and advocate for others falsely accused.

Initially, the Foundation sought to document the phenomena of false memories, provide support to parents accused by their adult children, and to raise awareness in the media. Other founding members of the FMSF were psychiatrists from Philadelphia, Martin Orne, and Harold Lief.

== Board members ==
Members of the FMS Foundation Scientific Advisory Board included a number of members of the National Academy of Sciences and Institute of Medicine: Aaron T. Beck, Rochel Gelman, Lila Gleitman, Ernest Hilgard, Philip S. Holzman, Elizabeth Loftus, Paul R. McHugh, and Ulric Neisser. The Scientific Advisory Board included both clinicians and researchers. The FMS Foundation was funded by contributions and had no ties to any commercial ventures. Ralph Underwager and his wife Hollida Wakefield were founding members of the foundation's scientific advisory board in 1993 when his comments from a 1991 article in Paidika: The Journal of Paedophilia came to public awareness. The article contained statements which were interpreted as supportive of paedophilia. In the controversy that followed, Underwager resigned from the FMSF's scientific advisory board. Underwager later claimed that the quotations in the Paidika article were taken out of context, used to discredit his ability to testify in courts and, through guilt by association, damage the reputation of the FMSF. Wakefield remained as a board member.

The FMSF dissolved on December 31, 2019, quoting the increasing number of supportive avenues online for discussion regarding false memories. With the increased education of the legal system regarding false or recovered memories, the need for the FMSF had declined.

== Reception and impact ==
Stanton states that, "Rarely has such a strange and little-understood organization had such a profound effect on media coverage of such a controversial matter." A study showed that in 1991 prior to the group's foundation, of the stories about abuse in several popular press outlets "more than 80 percent of the coverage was weighted toward stories of survivors, with recovered memory taken for granted and questionable therapy virtually ignored" but that three years later "more than 80 percent of the coverage focused on false accusations, often involving supposedly false memory" which the author of the study, Katherine Beckett, attributed to FMSF.

J.A. Walker claimed the FMSF reversed the gains made by feminists and victims in gaining acknowledgment of the incestuous sexual abuse of children. Responding to this criticism the Foundation stated, "Is it not 'harmful to feminism to portray women as having minds closed to scientific information and as being satisfied with sloppy, inaccurate statistics? Could it be viewed as a profound insult to women to give them slogans rather than accurate information about how memory works'". S.J. Dallam criticized the foundation for describing itself as a scientific organization while undertaking partisan political and social activity.

The claims made by the FMSF for the incidence and prevalence of false memories have been criticized as lacking evidence and disseminating alleged inaccurate statistics about the problem. While the existence of a specific diagnostic "syndrome" is debated, including amongst FMSF members, researchers affiliated with the FMSF have said that a memory should be presumed false if it involves accusations of satanic ritual abuse due to the unsubstantiated nature of reports and the 1992 FBI investigation on the matter. They further say that memories for events beginning between "birth and age 2" should be considered "with extreme caution". A distinguishing feature of FMS is that the memories were discovered after starting specific forms of therapy and considerable effort and time was taken to recover them through methods such as hypnosis, guided imagery, or attendance in groups that have a specific focus on recovering memories. Most of the reports by the FMSF are anecdotal, while studies cited by the FMSF are often laboratory experiments exploring the creation of memories that do not involve historical childhood sexual abuse. Ethical considerations prevent the implementation of experiments that would involve creating false memories related to childhood sexual abuse. In addition, though the FMSF claims false memories are due to dubious therapeutic practices, the organization presents no data to demonstrate these practices are widespread or form an organized treatment modality.

Astrophysicist and astrobiologist Carl Sagan cited material from a 1995 issue of the FMS Newsletter in his critique of the recovered memory claims of UFO abductees and those purporting to be victims of Satanic ritual abuse in his last book, The Demon-Haunted World: Science as a Candle in the Dark.
