= James M. Wood =

- Occupations: Researcher, educator

Academic background
- Education: Harvard University, University of Arizona, University of New Mexico, University of Texas at El Paso
- Alma mater: University of Arizona (Ph.D.)

Academic work
- Discipline: Clinical Psychologist
- Institutions: University of Texas at El Paso Department of Psychology
- Website: https://www.utep.edu/liberalarts/psychology/people/james-m-wood.html

James M. Wood is a clinical psychologist known for his work in social psychology, statistics, and cognition. He is a professor of psychology at the University of Texas at El Paso.

== Education ==
Wood received his B.A. Magna Cum Laude in Psychology from Harvard University in 1973. He attended the University of Arizona, where he obtained a master's degree in Clinical Psychology in 1988 and a Ph.D. in Clinical Psychology with a Minor in Statistics and Methodology in 1990. His completed his dissertation in Clinical Psychology on different types of memory for verbal stimuli while sleeping under his advisor, Richard R. Bootzin, Ph.D. Wood also obtained two additional master's degrees; a Master's in Counseling from the University of New Mexico in 1984 and a Master's in Statistics from the University of Texas at El Paso in 2007. He also attended Yale Divinity School and graduated as a Master of Divinity in 1979.

== Career ==
After obtaining his undergraduate degree, Wood worked from 1982 to 1984 at the Maternal and Infant Health Bureau at the New Mexico Department of Health as a statistician and planner. During this time, he worked on research on infant mortality and maternal deaths. From 1988 to 1989, Wood was a research assistant under John Kihlstrom for the Department of Psychology at the University of Arizona researching hypnosis and cognition. Wood continued his work as a research assistant at the University of Arizona from 1988 to 1989 under Richard Bootzin studying nightmares, sleep disorders, and cognitive processes during sleep. From 1990 to 1991, Wood worked as an assistant professor at the University of North Texas, where he worked in the Department of Psychology with a focus on cognition, aging, and sleep disorders. Wood then worked part time as a senior research specialist at the University of Arizona's Department of Psychology. He was there working under Lee Sechrest from 1991 to 1992, and focused on the studying the quality of life among mental health patients.

Wood began teaching at the University of Texas at El Paso in 1993. From 1993 to 1998, Wood was an assistant professor with the Department of Psychology. During this time, his main focus of study was legal psychology and child suggestibility. From 1998 to 2005, Wood worked as an associate professor in the Department of Psychology, continuing his work in legal psychology and child suggestibility. From May 2005 – August 2005, Wood worked on the Gulf War Project at the University of Texas Southwestern Medical School as a statistics intern under Robert Haley. This project focused on the analysis of data from veterans with Gulf War Syndrome. In September 2005, Wood was promoted to professor status in the Department of Psychology at the University of Texas at El Paso, which is a position he remains to this day. Wood was the Graduate Director of the Department of Psychology at the University of Texas at El Paso; however, he no longer holds that position and just remains as a professor in the program. He currently teaches Intro to Abnormal Psychology, Seminar in Psychopathology, Psychometrics, and Foundations of Research at the university.

=== Consultant work ===
From 1989 to 1990, Wood worked as a statistical consultant at Neonatal Intensive Care Study Unit at the University of Arizona Health Sciences Center. During this time, he analyzed data and assisted in the design of instruments to measure attitudes of personal in the neonatal intensive care unit. From 1987 to 1993, Wood was a member of the Evaluation Group for the Analysis of Data at the University of Arizona from 1987 to 1993. In August 2009, Wood also began working as a subcontractor for the Psychology Research Service at Lackland Air Force Base. Wood position is Senior Clinical and Measurement Psychologist, working on conduct analyses and the development and validation of a measurement to predict early termination of Air Force trainees. Wood has worked as a consulting editor for Psychological Assessment, Assessment, Child Maltreatment, and the Scientific Review of Mental Health Practices, and a reviewer for many other journals.

=== Public outreach ===
Wood was interviewed by PBS’ Frontline in 1998 for "The Child Terror" program that was discussed the daycare sex abuses cases in the 1980s and early 1990s. The program discussed the impact these cases had on the justice system, the credibility of children as witnesses in abuse cases, child advocacy, and child testimony. In 1990, Wood's study on nightmares during his time at the University of Arizona in Tucson was reported on by the New York Times. Wood discussed the commonality of nightmares and who experiences nightmares.

=== Research ===
Wood and his colleagues Scott Lilienfeld, Howard Garb, and Teresa Nezworksi published multiple critiques of the Rorschach Inkblot Test. This included the publication of a book entitled "What’s Wrong with the Rorschach?". His early research as a research assistant and consultant focused on neonatal care, nightmares, and cognition.

Wood is accredited to his popular research in child suggestibility and child forensic interviewing, which he published multiple works on and was interviewed about. One of his most popular articles published in the Journal of Applied Psychology in 1998 was written in collaboration with Sena Garven, Roy Malpass, and John Shaw, entitled "More Than Suggestion: The Effect of Interviewing Techniques from the McMartin Preschool Case". He also had early research conducted with the Air Force on predictive factors of early discharge in the military. In 2005, Wood began research on prediction of adverse outcomes in military and the juvenile justice system.

Wood's current research focus is methods to conduct effective investigative interviews and interrogations in law enforcement and national security settings. Within this field, Wood has conducted research specifically looking at the role of building rapport in interviews and the effects of conducting interviews through language interpreters. He also has research in psychopathic personality traits and cognitive dissonance that was published in 2012.
