= Child Maltreatment (journal) =

- Language: English
- Edited by: Daniel J. Whitaker, Ph.D.

Publication details
- History: 1996–present
- Publisher: SAGE Publications
- Frequency: Quarterly
- Impact factor: 3.1 (2025)

Standard abbreviations
- ISO 4: Child Maltreatment

Indexing
- ISSN: 1077-5595
- LCCN: 96640810
- OCLC no.: 41181179

Links
- Journal homepage; Current issue; All issues

Child Maltreatment is a peer-reviewed academic journal that publishes papers in the field of psychology, family studies and social work. It has been in publication since 1996 and is currently published by SAGE Publications in association with American Professional Society on the Abuse of Children. Vincent J. Palusci, MD, MS (New York University Grossman School of Medicine) became editor in chief in 2021.

== Scope ==
Child Maltreatment aims to report current and at-issue scientific information and technical innovations in a form immediately useful to practitioners and researchers from fields such as mental health, child protection, medicine and law. The multidisciplinary journal provides a forum for the discussion on dissemination of research and findings.

== Abstracting and indexing ==
Child Maltreatment is abstracted and indexed in, among other databases: SCOPUS, and the Social Sciences Citation Index. According to the Journal Citation Reports, its 2025 impact factor is 3.1, ranking it 3 out of 99 journals in the category "Social Work", and 6 out of 66 journals in the category "Family Studies".
