= Sam Hallam =

English victim of miscarriage of justice

Sam Hallam (born 1987), from Hoxton, London, is one of the youngest victims of a UK miscarriage of justice after an appeal court quashed his murder conviction in 2012.

== Background ==
In 2004, aged 17, Hallam had been sentenced to serve a minimum of 12 years in prison for the murder of a trainee chef, Essayas Kassahun, during a street brawl in Old Street.

Two witnesses claimed to have seen him at the scene, but their evidence was unreliable, with one witness attempting to go back on his statement in court, and another saying, "I just wanted someone to blame on the spot, really." No other evidence, forensic or otherwise, existed to link him to the scene, and Hallam always maintained he was not there, although he had no alibi to prove it.

== The campaign ==
Friends and family of Hallam asked veteran human-rights campaigner Paul May to set up a campaign to prove his innocence. May mounted a legal appeal for Hallam and arranged numerous events and media interviews to publicise the case.

Actor Ray Winstone presented a TV documentary which was screened in 2010 which outlined the flaws in the case against Hallam

Playwright Tess Berry-Hart created a verbatim theatre play Someone To Blame as part of the campaign to raise awareness of the case. Directed by David Mercatali, the play used verbatim court transcripts, witness testimony and first-person interviews from the original case and ran at the King's Head Theatre Islington in February 2012.

=== First appeal ===
In 2007, there was a failed appeal with the judges holding that the evidence of the witnesses could still be relied upon. The case was then referred to the Criminal Cases Review Commission, which spent three years examining his case. Thames Valley Police was instructed on their behalf to examine the original Metropolitan Police investigation. Based on their findings, the case was sent back to the Court of Appeal.

=== Second appeal ===
In May 2012 after only three hours hearing, the Crown Prosecution Service decided not to defend the conviction, and the three judges led by Lady Justice Hallett granted temporary bail. Hallam walked out the front doors of the Court of Appeal and was drenched in champagne. The next day, Hallam attended court with his mother, Wendy Cohen, to hear his murder conviction formally overturned.

After Hallam's release, Someone To Blame was updated for a weekend run at the King's Head to celebrate his freedom. Hallam's father and grandmother had both died while he was imprisoned.

== Later events ==
Hallam launched a legal challenge in January 2015 challenging the law that prevents him from receiving compensation for the years he wrongly spent in prison. The case was unsuccessful, causing a debate over whether the UK compensation system was incompatible with the presumption of innocence.

In July 2023 Hallam took his case for compensation for wrongful imprisonment to the European Court of Human Rights. In 2024 the ECtHR ruled against Hallam, finding that, although the U.K.'s compensation test was "almost insurmountable", it did not violate the European Convention on Human Rights.

== See also ==
- List of miscarriage of justice cases
