= Jorge Luiz Thais Martins =

Brazilian serial killer

Jorge Luiz Thais Martins is a Brazilian man and former colonel of the Military Firefighters Corps who was previously convicted of killing 9 drug addicts during a five-month period between August 2010 and January 2011 in the city of Curitiba, the state capital of Paraná. The case garnered massive attention, and through police misconduct, Thais was erroneously arrested and convicted for them with the supposed motive that he wanted to avenge the death of his son, Jorge Guilherme Marinho Martins. This supposed motive led to comparisons to the main character of the 1974 American film Death Wish, who went on a revenge-motivated killing spree to avenge the murder of his wife and the rape of his daughter.

== Prosecution ==
Thais was initially presented as the prime suspect when several witnesses supposedly recognized him as the "executioner". Due to the fact that the murders began shortly after his son was murdered in a botched robbery by two drug addicts, local authorities believed that he had a reasonable motive to commit the murders and thus arrested him for the crimes.

While his initial detention lasted only 19 days and he was released thanks to a habeas corpus motion from his lawyers, prosecutors were able to convince the jury that he was guilty. Despite the fact that virtually all of the evidence was circumstantial and based on witness testimony and analyses of photographs, Thais was found guilty and imprisoned. The conviction proved to be devastating for his family, with his father supposedly dying from stress due to it.

== Exoneration ==
The case took a turn in August 2013, when two of the witnesses who had originally identified him went to the police station and claimed that they had made a mistake. This subsequently led to a review of the case that scrutinized the lack of concrete evidence that tied Thais to the killings.

In March 2016, Thais was acquitted of all charges and formally exonerated, as all the murders were proven to be the doing of five current and former police officers from the Military Police that had formed a death squad. The following year, he filed a lawsuit against the state of Paraná, which was backed by his lawyers and several military institutions, all of whom signed a petition urging the state to compensate him. In November 2019, the Court of Justice of the State of Paraná (TJ-PR) ordered that the state compensate him with 50,000 reais.

== See also ==
- List of miscarriage of justice cases
