= Kaj Linna =

Exonerated Finnish man (born 1962)

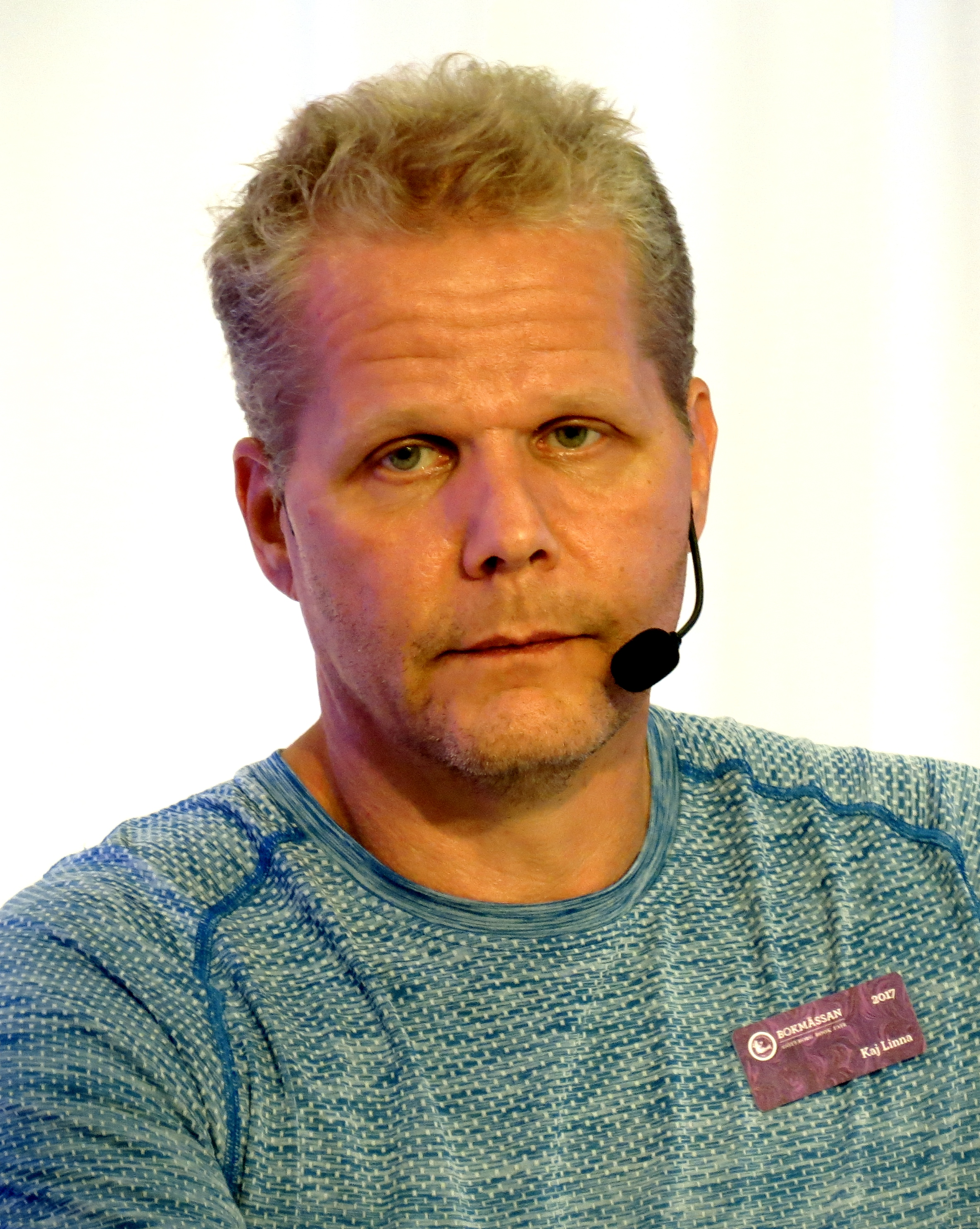
- Linna in 2017
- Born: Kaj Juhani Kaukosalo; 12 May 1962 (age 63); Krylbo, Sweden

Kaj Johannes Linna (born Kaj Juhani Kaukosalo, 12 May 1962), is a Finnish man who was sentenced to life imprisonment for a robbery-murder in Kalamark outside of Piteå, Sweden, on 14 April 2004. He served the longest overturned sentence in Swedish history before a retrial was ordered, in which he was exonerated and freed. He was later awarded 18 million SEK as compensation for his time in prison, a record sum.

== Early life ==
Linna was born in Sweden to Finnish parents.

== Original case ==
Linna was accused of murdering Roger Lindberg and seriously injuring his brother Sune. Sune could not defend himself because he had suffered a stroke in 1994. He was attacked in bed and lay on the floor for one and a half days before being found by social workers. Sune still claims that Kaj Linna was the person that attacked him and killed his brother. Roger had been overpowered in the brothers' barn, tied up and beaten to death. Linna was arrested in Swansea, Wales, three months after the murder and was extradited to Sweden the same year. In 2005, Linna was found guilty of the crimes and sentenced to life imprisonment.

== Reexamination of case and exoneration ==
The true-crime podcast Spår (Traces) was the first to raise questions about the case and trial of Linna. The podcast was hosted by journalists Anton Berg and Martin Johnson, who also performed the investigation into the case.

In December 2016, Linna's conviction was thrown out by the Swedish High Court and Linna was later exonerated. Having been incarcerated for 13 years, Linna is the person who has served the longest time in prison in Sweden to be exonerated and released.

In May 2017, a new trial started for Linna and on 30 May he was released to await the High Court's judgment. On 15 June, Linna was completely exonerated.

Linna was awarded a record amount in damages of 18 million SEK by the Swedish state.

== After release ==
On 25 June 2018, Kaj Linna presented an episode of Sommar i P1 which was broadcast on Sveriges Radio, talking about his life in prison and about his sentence and exoneration. Linna and his wife moved to the Canary Islands after his release where he lived until 2020 when he separated from his wife who he met while in prison as she was the prison's Spanish language teacher. Linna now lives in the Philippines with his new wife and son where he managed his construction company.

In October 2018, Linna published the autobiography Besökaren: mina 13 år bakom galler (The visitor: My 13 years behind bars).

== See also ==
- List of unsolved deaths
- List of miscarriage of justice cases

== Bibliography ==
- 2018 - Besökaren: mina 13 år bakom galler ISBN 9789188671462
