= List of miscarriage of justice cases =

This is a list of miscarriage of justice cases. This list includes cases where a convicted individual was later cleared of the crime and either has received an official exoneration, or a consensus exists that the individual was unjustly punished or where a conviction has been quashed and no retrial has taken place, so that the accused is legally assumed innocent. This list is not exhaustive. Crime descriptions with an asterisk indicate that the events were later determined not to be criminal acts.

== List of cases ==
=== Argentina ===
Date of crime	Defendant(s)	Crime	Location	Sentence	Time served	Legally exonerated
January 25, 2005	Fernando Ariel Carrera	Aggravated manslaughter and robbery	Buenos Aires	30 years	6 years	Yes
January 25, 2005	Fernando Ariel Carrera	Fernando Ariel Carrera was wrongly suspected by police of carrying out a robbery in January 2005 (Masacre de Pompeya (es)). He was stopped by police while driving, and as the officers failed to identify themselves as police, he panicked and tried to escape. The police then shot at his car as he escaped, and he was hit eight times. While unconscious, his car continued driving for 200 meters and fatally ran down two women and a child. Carrera was taken to hospital in serious condition and survived. He was subsequently put on trial, and in June 2007 was convicted of robbery and aggravated manslaughter. He was sentenced to 30 years in prison, which was subsequently reduced to 15 years. Irregularities were found in his case. He was released on a court order in 2013, though without being declared innocent. The Supreme Court of Argentina officially exonerated him in October 2016.				

=== Armenia ===
Date of crime	Defendant(s)	Crime	Location	Sentence	Time served	Legally exonerated
October 8, 1998	Armen Poghosyan	Rape and murder	Saratovka, Armenia	15 years in prison	5 years, 6 months	Yes
October 8, 1998	Armen Poghosyan	Poghosyan was arrested in 1998 on suspicion of rape and murder. He and his brother were subjected to physical violence by the police (beating, punching, kicking, blows to the ears causing a broken eardrum, forced to sit on a bottle) to force a confession from Poghosyan. The Lori Regional Court convicted Poghosyan of rape and murder in 1999. In 2003 following another offense, the real culprit was found; it became clear that the evidence against Poghosyan had been fabricated by the police and he was freed. Two police officers were convicted of ill-treating the prisoners and fabricating evidence.				

=== Australia ===
Date of crime	Defendant(s)	Crime	Location	Sentence	Time served	Legally exonerated
December 30, 1921	Colin Campbell Ross	Rape and murder by strangulation of Alma Tirtschke	Little Collins Street, Melbourne, Australia	Death	Executed	Yes, posthumously exonerated
December 30, 1921	Colin Campbell Ross	Twelve-year-old Nell Alma Tirtschke left home on an errand for her grandmother. Early the next morning, her body was found in Gun Alley. She had been raped and strangled. Colin Campbell Ross was convicted on the basis of several witnesses who testified that Ross confessed to them as well several strands of blonde hair on a blanket at Ross's house. In 1993, a former school teacher named Kevin Morgan began researching Ross's case. Morgan found a file in the Office of Public Prosecutions containing the original hair samples, which had been thought lost. In 1998, two independent scientific authorities—the Victorian Institute of Forensic Medicine and the forensics division of the Australian Federal Police—found that the two lots of hair did not come from the same person, thereby disproving with certainty the most damning piece of evidence presented at Ross's trial. Ross was pardoned on May 27, 2008, 86 years after his execution.				
December 20, 1959	Darryl Beamish	Murder of 22-year-old socialite Jillian MacPherson Brewer	Perth, Australia	Death, commuted to life imprisonment	15 years (including five years served after assaulting a young girl while on parole)	Yes
December 20, 1959	Darryl Beamish	Brewer was the great-granddaughter of industrialist and philanthropist Sir Macpherson Robertson and was heir to MacRobertson's chocolates. Brewer was killed by an intruder with a tomahawk and scissors in her beachside apartment. Beamish, a deaf and mute who had recently pleaded guilty to molesting four young girls and had a history of breaking and entering, lived near Brewer. He signed a confession, which he claimed he signed under duress. It was later determined that Brewer's murder was committed by Perth serial killer Eric Edgar Cooke, who confessed to the murder prior to his execution. Another man, John Button, was also convicted of a murder assumed to have been committed by Cooke.				
February 9, 1963	John Button	Murder of his 17-year-old girlfriend Rosemary Anderson	Fremantle, Western Australia	10 years	4 years, 9 months	Yes
February 9, 1963	John Button	Nineteen-year-old Button and his girlfriend Rosemary Anderson were celebrating his birthday at his parents' house. After an argument, Anderson decided to walk home. Button followed her in his car but she refused to get in and continued walking. Button stopped to smoke a cigarette before driving on. He found her lying injured and unconscious on the side of the road. She died later at the hospital. Button had a bad stutter and police interpreted this as being nervous due to the questions he was being asked. Button was refused access to his parents or a lawyer and was hit once by an interviewing police officer, before finally confessing to killing Anderson after 22 hours of interrogation. Damage to Button's car was also introduced at trial. He was charged with wilful murder, but served five years of a 10-year sentence after being convicted of a lesser charge of manslaughter. In 1963, Perth serial killer, Eric Edgar Cooke, confessed to the murder of Anderson when arrested in 1963 and again before he was executed. At his appeal, Trevor Condron, the police officer who had examined John Button's car in 1963 told the appeals court that while the car was damaged, the damage was not consistent with hitting a person and that three weeks before Anderson's death, Button had reported to police another accident. This accident report had been known to police at the original trial but been discounted as irrelevant. The court also heard from Dr Neil Turner, who had treated Anderson. He claimed that her injuries were not consistent with Button's vehicle. The world's leading pedestrian accident expert, American William "Rusty" Haight, was flown to Australia and testified that experiments with a biomedical human-form dummy, a similar Simca to Button's and an EJ Holden similar to the one Cooke claimed he was driving when he hit Anderson, matched exactly Cooke's account and excluded the Simca. In February 2002, the Court of Criminal Appeal quashed Button's conviction. Button now spearheads the Western Australian Innocence Project, which aims to free the wrongfully convicted.				
September 14, 1964	Alexander McLeod-Lindsay	Attempted murder of his wife, Pamela Parsons	Sylvania, New South Wales.	18 years	9 years	Yes
September 14, 1964	Alexander McLeod-Lindsay	McLeod-Lindsay returned from work to find his wife Pamela and son Bruce severely beaten. Police developed the theory that he had slipped away from the hotel, attacked his family and returned to work, unnoticed. Blood on McLeod-Lindsay's jacket was said to have been "impact splatter", and deposited during the attack. Both victims survived the attack. Pamela McLeod-Lindsay was adamant that her husband had not attacked her. She said that the attacker had an Australian accent. McLeod-Lindsay's accent was Scottish. McLeod-Lindsay was charged anyway with the attempted murder of his wife and son. The prosecution contended that Pamela McLeod-Lindsay was lying to protect the family's income. McLeod-Lindsay was found guilty. McLeod-Lindsay was exonerated after a further review by another blood spatter pattern expert determined that the pattern was likely caused by transfer when he cradled his wife rather than by blows.				
December 3, 1977	Edward Splatt	Murder and sexual assault of 77-year-old Rosa Simper	Cheltenham, South Australia	Life imprisonment	7 years	No
December 3, 1977	Edward Splatt	Splatt spent seven years in jail for the murder of Rosa Simper but a Royal Commission led to a pardon and compensation of $300,000 in 1984. The commission found that forensic evidence was unreliable and that some contamination of the crime scene had possibly occurred.				
June 4, 1979	David Szach	Murder of 44-year-old partner Derrance Stevenson	Parkside, South Australia	Life imprisonment	14 years	No
June 4, 1979	David Szach	19-year-old David Szach was convicted of murdering his 44-year-old lover, Derrance Stevenson, after his body was found in a freezer with a gunshot to the back of the head.				
August 17, 1980	Lindy Chamberlain-Creighton, Michael Chamberlain	Murder of their daughter, Azaria*	Uluru, Northern Territory of Australia	Life imprisonment	3 years	Yes
August 17, 1980	Lindy Chamberlain-Creighton, Michael Chamberlain	Lindy Chamberlain-Creighton was convicted in 1982 for the murder of her nine-week-old daughter, Azaria, after claiming that the baby had been taken by a dingo. In 1986, a British tourist fell to his death in Uluru while hiking. During the search for his remains, Azaria's missing matinee jacket was discovered in an area full of dingo lairs. The Chief Minister of the Northern Territory ordered Lindy Chamberlain's immediate release and the case was reopened. On September 15, 1988, the Northern Territory Court of Criminal Appeals unanimously overturned all convictions against Lindy and her husband, Michael Chamberlain, who had been convicted of accessory after the fact.				
June 22, 1982	Ray, Peter and Brian Mickelberg	Robbery (the Perth Mint Swindle)	Perth, Western Australia	20, 16 and 12 years in prison, respectively.	Varied	Yes
June 22, 1982	Ray, Peter and Brian Mickelberg	Ray, Peter, and Brian Mickelberg were convicted in 1983 of the Perth Mint Swindle. In 2002, Tony Lewandowski came forward and admitted the police had framed the brothers. In July 2004 their convictions were quashed and as part of a libel settlement, the West Australian police issued a public apology in December 2007. They were given A$500,000 each and $658,672 to cover legal fees.				
January 4, 1983	Raymond Geesing	Murder	Hackham, South Australia	Life imprisonment	17 months	Yes
January 4, 1983	Raymond Geesing	10-year-old Louise Bell was abducted from her home on the night of January 4, 1983. Louise was never found and is believed dead. Later that year several jailhouse informants reported that Raymond John Geesing, imprisoned for an unrelated crime, had confessed to abducting and murdering Louise. He was convicted in 1984, but the following year his conviction was quashed on appeal. The court of appeal found that the prison witnesses were unreliable and should not have been believed. A man named Dieter Pfennig was later convicted of Louise Bell's murder after his DNA was found on her clothes, which had been recovered from a nearby house.				
May 1983	Margaret Burton	Murder*	New South Wales	Life imprisonment	2 years	Partial
May 1983	Margaret Burton	Margaret Burton was accused of conspiring with her friend Ronald Burke to murder her husband Peter, whose body was never found. She was found guilty of murder in 1984, and both she and Burke were also separately found guilty of conspiracy to murder. In 1986, her murder conviction was quashed after video footage surfaced showing Peter Burton alive after his supposed murder. However, Burton and Burke's conviction for plotting to murder Peter Burton was not overturned and they were still required to serve an eight-year prison sentence for conspiracy to murder.				
1984	Kevin Condren	Murder	Goodna, Queensland	Life imprisonment	6 years	Yes
1984	Kevin Condren	Condren was an aboriginal Australian who was convicted on the basis of his alleged confession, which he said was based on police coercion and fabrication. Three new witnesses who did not testify at his trial came forward. Based on their testimony and serious doubts about the validity of Condren's confession, the Court of Appeal reversed his conviction in 1990. He was awarded A$400,000 in 1991.				
January 10, 1989	David Eastman	Assassination of Police Commissioner Colin Winchester	Canberra, Australian Capital Territory	Life imprisonment	19 years	Yes
January 10, 1989	David Eastman	Eastman was found guilty after a trial by jury in 1995. After 19 years in gaol a judicial inquiry determined that Eastman was the victim of a miscarriage of justice; his conviction was quashed on August 22, 2014, and he was released. He was tried a second time and, on November 22, 2018, found not guilty.				
February 20, 1989 - February 27, 1999	Kathleen Folbigg	Murder of her four children*		40 years, reduced on appeal to 30 years	20 years	Yes
February 20, 1989 - February 27, 1999	Kathleen Folbigg	Folbigg and her husband had four children, all of whom died suddenly in infancy between 1989 and 1999. After the fourth death, Folbigg was charged with murder. The case was based on Meadow's law, a statistical principle stating that three or more sudden infant deaths in one family are murder unless proven otherwise; this principle was later discredited after it was found to have led to multiple wrongful convictions in the United Kingdom. Folbigg was convicted in 2003 and sentenced to 40 years in prison, which was reduced to 30 years on appeal. In 2018 an investigation by Carola Garcia de Vinuesa led to the discovery that Folbigg's children had likely died due to a genetic mutation they had inherited from her, rather than foul play. After a judicial review refused to overturn her conviction, she was pardoned by New South Wales governor Margaret Beazley in June 2023. Later that year her conviction was quashed by the Court of Criminal Appeal.				
September 1991	Graham Stafford	Murder of Leanne Sarah Holland	Queensland	Life imprisonment	14 years	Yes
September 1991	Graham Stafford	The conviction of Stafford was based on forensic evidence that was undermined in subsequent appeals, including an unprecedented third appeal. The Court of Appeal held he had been denied a fair trial and ordered a retrial; However, the Director of Public Prosecutions subsequently decided a new trial would not be in the public interest.				
March 18, 1994	Henry Keogh	Murder of his fiancée, Anna-Jane Cheney*	Magill, South Australia	26 years	21 years	Yes
March 18, 1994	Henry Keogh	The evidence used in Keogh's trial was scanty and obscure, and it was later revealed that police withheld vital information from his defence team. A forensic review of the case concluded that there was no evidence Cheney was even murdered. His conviction was quashed, and while a retrial was initially pursued, it was subsequently abandoned.				
May 23, 1994	Andrew Mallard	Murder of Pamela Lawrence	Perth, Western Australia		11 years	Yes
May 23, 1994	Andrew Mallard	Andrew Mallard was convicted for the murder of jeweller Pamela Lawrence in 1994 after eight unrecorded hours of police interrogation and a brief recorded "confession" that followed. In 2005, the High Court of Australia was advised that the prosecution and/or police had withheld evidence that showed his innocence, and overturned his conviction. Mallard was released from prison. A "cold case" review of the murder conducted after Mallard's release implicated Simon Rochford as the actual offender, and Mallard was exonerated.				
December 1996 and February 1997	George Pell	Child sexual abuse	St. Patrick's Cathedral, Melbourne, Australia	6 years	1 year	Yes
December 1996 and February 1997	George Pell	In a much-publicized case, Pell, a cardinal of the Catholic Church and high-ranking official of the Roman Curia, was found guilty on December 11, 2018, on five charges related to sexual assault of two 13-year-old boys while Archbishop of Melbourne in the 1990s and was sentenced to six years in prison. In August 2019, an appeal against his conviction was dismissed by a majority of two-to-one in the Victorian Court of Appeal. The High Court of Australia ultimately quashed Pell's convictions and substituted verdicts of acquittal on April 7, 2020, in a unanimous decision. In the Court's summary of its judgment, the justices wrote that there was "a significant possibility that an innocent person has been convicted because the evidence did not establish guilt to the requisite standard of proof".				
November 15, 2001	Rory Christie	Murder	Perth	Life imprisonment	4 years	Yes
November 15, 2001	Rory Christie	Rory Christie was jailed for a minimum of 11 years in 2003 for the alleged murder of his estranged wife Susan, who disappeared in November 2001. The only substantial evidence against him was that traces of Susan's blood were found on his tie, which he claimed was from where he had helped her with a bloody nose earlier in the day. Witnesses who supported this story were later found, and Christie's conviction was quashed because this evidence raised a reasonable doubt that the blood found on his tie came from where he had allegedly killed Susan. A judge later ruled Christie could not be re-tried, as apart from the blood on the tie there was no evidence against him.				
September 15, 2003	Ram Tiwary	Murders of Tay Chow Lyang and Tony Tan Poh Chuan	Sydney	Life in prison	8 years	Yes
September 15, 2003	Ram Tiwary	Two Singaporean students, Tay Chow Lyang and Tony Tan Poh Chuan, were beaten and stabbed to death in two separate attacks in their apartment in Sydney on September 15, 2003. Their flatmate, fellow Singaporean Ram Tiwary, was convicted of the murders, which he was alleged to have committed for financial reasons. The main evidence against him was that his fingerprints were found on one of the murder weapons, which he said he had picked up when he found the bodies. Despite the ferocity of the attack there was only a minuscule amount of blood on Tiwary, which was consistent with his story that Tony's blood (none of Tay's blood was found on him) had gotten on him from an expiration reflex when he checked his pulse. Blood found on the exterior door also suggested that the killer had fled the scene after committing the murders, which was supported by witnesses who had seen an unidentified car speeding away from the crime scene, yet Tiwary was still in the house when police arrived a few minutes later. A retrial took place in 2009 after the judge was found to have misdirected the jury and also ended in a guilty verdict. However, in 2012 the Court of Appeal quashed Tiwary's conviction after concluding that the evidence did not prove Tiwary's guilt.				
November 12, 2012	Steven Mark John Fennel	Murder of Liselotte Watson	Macleay Island, Queensland		6 years	Yes
November 12, 2012	Steven Mark John Fennel	Steven Mark John Fennel was convicted for the murder of 85-year-old woman Liselotte Watson. In 2019, the High Court of Australia overturned his conviction in Fennel v The Queen 2019 HCA 37 https://eresources.hcourt.gov.au/showCase/2019/HCA/37. Fennel is suing the Queensland government for $5.5 million for wrongful imprisonment.				

=== Brazil ===
Date of crime	Defendant(s)	Crime	Location	Sentence	Time served	Legally exonerated
2010 – 2011	Jorge Luiz Thais Martins	Murders of nine drug addicts	Curitiba		5 years	Yes
2010 – 2011	Jorge Luiz Thais Martins	A former colonel in the Military Firefighters Corps, Thais was arrested for the murders after several witnesses mistakenly identified him as the killer and that he supposedly wanted to avenge the murder of his son, who was killed during a botched robbery in 2009. He was acquitted and formally exonerated in 2016, when members of a death squad formed by five Military Police officers was linked to the murders. Thais successfully sued the state of Paraná in 2019 and compensated with 50,000 reais.				

=== Canada ===
Date of crime	Defendant(s)	Crime	Location	Sentence	Time served	Legally exonerated
June 9, 1959	Steven Truscott	Rape and murder of classmate Lynne Harper	Vanastra, Ontario	Death, then Life in Prison	10 years	Yes
June 9, 1959	Steven Truscott	Steven Truscott's wrongful conviction of murder in the death of Lynne Harper stood for 48 years before finally being overturned on August 28, 2007.				
December 14, 1961	Réjean Hinse	Armed robbery of a general store	Mont-Laurier, Quebec	15 years	8 years	Yes
December 14, 1961	Réjean Hinse	Claimed he was 200 km away in Montreal at the time of the robbery. The Quebec Police Commission concluded in 1989 that Hinse was the victim of "a botched investigation". The Supreme Court of Canada, in 2015, dismissed a large compensation that would have been the largest wrongful conviction award in Canadian history. In April 2011, after a legal battle lasting nearly fifty years, Hinse was awarded $13.1 million compensation, payable by the Quebec and Canadian Federal governments, the largest wrongful conviction award in Canadian history.				
August 9, 1967	Roméo Phillion	Murder of Léopold Roy	Ottawa, Ontario	Life in prison	31 years	Yes
August 9, 1967	Roméo Phillion	Murder of veteran of fire department Léopold Roy Phillion died in 2015 at the age of 76 before his $14 million lawsuit against the Ontario government had been settled. The longest ever sentence served by a Canadian prisoner whose conviction was later overturned.				
January 31, 1969	David Milgaard	Murder of 20-year-old nursing student, Gail Miller	Saskatoon, Saskatchewan	Life in Prison	23 years	Yes
January 31, 1969	David Milgaard	In 1969, 16-year-old David Milgaard was convicted and given a life sentence for the murder of 20-year-old nursing aide Gail Miller. After 23 years of imprisonment, the Supreme Court of Canada allowed for the release of Milgaard. In 1997 Milgaard, received an apology from the Saskatchewan government after DNA tests in the U.K. excluded him.				
September 20, 1970	John Salmon	Manslaughter of his wife, Maxine Ditchfield*	Woodstock, Ontario	10 years	3 years	Yes
September 20, 1970	John Salmon	Salmon and his common-law wife, Maxine Ditchfield, returned home from a night out with friends in the early hours of September 20, 1970. Later that day, Salmon found Ditchfield lying on the floor with a head injury. She died in hospital two days later. The police believed that Salmon had beaten Ditchfield during a drunken argument, as the two of them had argued earlier that night, and their son said he had seen Salmon pushing Ditchfield to the floor. Salmon argued that her head injury was caused when she drunkenly fell out of her chair earlier in the night, but was found guilty of manslaughter and served three years of a ten-year prison sentence before being released on parole in 1974. In the mid-2000s Salmon contacted the Association in the Defence of the Wrongly Convicted, who had the case reviewed by three pathologists who agreed that Ditchfield's injuries were not consistent with a physical assault. They concluded that Ditchfield had suffered a blood clot on her brain as a result of her earlier fall which had caused her to suffer a fatal stroke. It was also established that Salmon's son could not have seen the alleged fight from where he had claimed to be standing. The Crown Attorney admitted that Salmon was wrongly convicted and the court of appeal cleared Salmon in 2015.				
May 28, 1971	Donald Marshall Jr.	Murder of Sandy Seale	Sydney, Nova Scotia	Life imprisonment	11 years	Yes
May 28, 1971	Donald Marshall Jr.	Donald Marshall Jr. and Sandy Seale, then both 17 years old, had been walking around Wentworth Park in Sydney, Nova Scotia during the late evening with the intent to "roll a drunk" as stated at Marshall's trial. They confronted an older man they encountered in the park named Roy Ebsary. Seale was stabbed to death. Police speculated that Marshall Jr. had murdered Seale and he was convicted on the basis of witness statements. Several years later, a witness came forward to say he had seen another man stab Seale, and several prior witness statements pinpointing Marshall Jr. were recanted. A year after the appeal, the Nova Scotia Court of Appeal declared him not guilty of the murder. In its ruling, however, the court opined that Marshall Jr. was "the author of his own misfortune", essentially blaming him for the conviction. A 1990 royal commission of inquiry criticized that finding as "a serious and fundamental error", blaming police incompetence and "systemic racism" for the conviction (Marshall is Mi’kmaq). His case led to widespread changes in Canada's evidence disclosure rules. Prosecutors had withheld exculpatory evidence from the defence in the Marshall Jr. case; the prosecution must now fully disclose to the defence any evidence it has in its possession. Ebsary was subsequently tried and convicted of manslaughter.				
December 23, 1981	Thomas Sophonow	Murder of 16-year-old Barbara Stoppel			4 years	Yes
December 23, 1981	Thomas Sophonow	Stoppel was working at the Ideal Donut Shop in Winnipeg when she was found strangled in the restroom with a nylon cord. She died five days later. Witnesses gave police a description of a man wearing a cowboy hat enter the establishment, lock the door, and walk towards the back. Sophonow, who had a police record, bore a resemblance to the sketch. He was convicted on the basis of the eyewitness identification and a jailhouse informant who testified that Sophonow confessed to him. Sophonow was tried three times. The first ended in a mistrial, the second two in convictions. Both convictions were overturned and the court of appeal ordered an acquittal. The Winnipeg police service began a reinvestigation and in June 2000, they publicly announced that Sophonow was innocent and another suspect had been identified. In 2001, Justice Peter Cory concluded that police misconduct contributed to the wrongful conviction. The use of jailhouse informants and misuse and manipulation of eyewitness accounts was criticized.				
October 3, 1983	Andy Rose	Murder of Andrea Scherpf and Bernd Göricke	Chetwynd, British Columbia	15 years	10 years	Yes
October 3, 1983	Andy Rose	German tourists Scherpf and Göricke were murdered while hitch-hiking in October 1983. Andy Rose was twice convicted of the murders based on the testimony of Madonna Kelly, a woman who claimed to have seen him with blood on his clothes claiming to have killed two people. His conviction was overturned after DNA testing revealed the murders were committed by an unidentified person; the prosecution successfully argued for a third trial after the police got Rose to confess through a Mr. Big operation, but the trial collapsed and Rose was acquitted.				
October 3, 1984	Guy Paul Morin	Rape and murder of his 9-year-old neighbour, Christine Jessop	Queensville, Ontario	Life in prison	3 years	Yes
October 3, 1984	Guy Paul Morin	Jessop disappeared after being dropped off by the school bus at her home. Her body was discovered on December 31, nearly three months later. She had been sexually assaulted and murdered. Morin was arrested for Jessop's murder in April 1985 and was acquitted. The Crown exercised its right to appeal the verdict on the grounds that the trial judge made a fundamental error prejudicing the Crown's right to a fair trial. In 1987 the Court of Appeal ordered a new trial. In 1992, Morin was convicted at his second trial and was sentenced to life imprisonment. Improvements in DNA testing led to a test in 1995 that excluded Morin as the murderer. Morin's appeal of his conviction was allowed (i.e., the conviction was reversed), and a directed verdict of acquittal entered in the appeal. An inquiry culminating in the Kaufman Report into Morin's case also uncovered evidence of police and prosecutorial misconduct, and of misrepresentation of forensic evidence by the Ontario Centre of Forensic Sciences. The identity of Christine Jessop's murderer was announced in October 2020—Calvin Hoover, who had died in 2015.				
June 19, 1990	Robert Baltovich	Murder of his girlfriend, Elizabeth Bain	Scarborough, Ontario, Canada.	Life	11 years	Yes
June 19, 1990	Robert Baltovich	Robert Baltovich was convicted in 1992 of the murder of Elizabeth Bain; released in 2000 to prepare an appeal based on new evidence. The Court of Appeal for Ontario ordered a new trial, which began in March 2008. At the outset of the trial, the Crown declined to call any evidence, and the judge ordered the jury to bring a verdict of not guilty. Circumstantial evidence pointed to the serial killer Paul Bernardo, an acquaintance of Bain's, as the murderer. The Ontario Attorney-General denied financial compensation to Baltovich in 2010.				
September 1990	James Driskell	Murder of Perry Harder	Winnipeg, Manitoba	Life in prison	12 years	No
September 1990	James Driskell	Harder was murdered by being shot several times in the chest and buried in a shallow grave near some railroad tracks. Police suspected Driskell of the murders because Harder implicated Driskell in a series of break-ins. The prosecution presented three hairs from Driskell's van that they argued belonged to Harder. A later review by the Forensic Science Services in England determined that none of the hairs belonged to Harder. It was later discovered that a key police witness, Ray Zanidean, tried to recant his testimony. In exchange for his testimony, police made a deal with Zanidean that he would not be charged in an arson case. He also received payment for his legal fees and received money for mortgage payments that were in arrears. He also received $20,000 payment. This information was not disclosed to the jury. Although he has not been formally exonerated, he was released on November 24, 2003.				
June 26, 1993	William Mullins-Johnson	Murder of his 4-year-old niece Valin*	Sault Ste Marie, Ontario, Canada	Life in prison	12	Yes
June 26, 1993	William Mullins-Johnson	4-year-old Valin Johnson was found dead in bed on June 27, 1994, having died the previous night. At the time of her death she was being looked after by her uncle, William Mullins-Johnson. It was initially thought that she could have died of natural causes, before pathologist Charles Smith (who would later be exposed as having bungled a number of autopsies, resulting in wrongful convictions) concluded that she was sexually assaulted prior to her death. Mullins-Johnson was convicted of murder in September 2004. Eleven years after the trial, missing tissue samples from the case were located and analysed by three pathologists who concluded that Valin had not been sexually assaulted. This removed any evidence that she had been murdered, and Mullins-Johnson was acquitted on appeal in 2007.				
October 9, 1993	Tammy Marquardt	Murder of her son, Kenneth*	Toronto, Ontario, Canada	Life in prison	14	Yes
October 9, 1993	Tammy Marquardt	Tammy was home with her 2 1/2-year-old son Kenneth, who was napping in their spare bedroom. When she checked on him, she found him tangled in the sheets and gasping for breath. Kenneth suffered irreparable brain damage and was taken off life support three days later. Dr. Charles Smith, who was considered to be the leading expert in Canada on criminally suspicious pediatric deaths, was consulted on the case. Smith concluded that Kenneth's death was not accidental. Tammy's defence insisted her son died from complications of an epileptic seizure. She was convicted. Smith's work subsequently came into question on a number of cases. On June 7, 2005, Chief Coroner for Ontario, Dr. Barry McLellan, announced that a formal review would be conducted of criminal cases for which Smith had performed the autopsy. In October 2007, another forensic pathologist assigned to the case concluded that Smith's finding of asphyxia was "illogical and completely against scientific evidence-based reasoning". In 2011, the Ontario Court of Appeal quashed Marquadt's conviction and the Crown withdrew the charges against her. Experts hired by the prosecution agreed that Sudden Unexpected Death in Epilepsy (SUDEP) could not be ruled out as the cause of death in Kenneth's case as well as other natural cases of death.				
August 4, 2002	Nelson Hart	Murder of his twin daughters, Krista and Karen	Little Harbour, Newfoundland and Labrador	Life in prison	7 years	Yes
August 4, 2002	Nelson Hart	Hart was accused of murdering his 2-year-old twin daughters, Krista and Karen, who drowned during a trip to Little Harbour. According to Hart, Krista fell into the water while he was suffering an epileptic seizure, and Hart, who could not swim, was obliged to drive back to Gander Lake to get help. By the time he returned, Krista had drowned and Karen had fallen into the water in his absence and also drowned. Police were suspicious of Hart's story and initiated a covert Mr. Big operation in which undercover police officers enticed Hart into a fictional crime gang before pressuring him into confessing to pushing his daughters into the lake under the threat of expelling him from the gang. Hart was convicted of his daughter's murder in 2007. He appealed his conviction arguing that his confession was inadmissible as evidence. In 2012 the Court of Appeal ruled that Hart's confession was coerced, the police involved in the investigation having threatened him with expulsion from the gang unless he told them what they wanted to hear. The court ordered a new trial. Two years later, Hart was released from prison after the prosecution decided they did not have enough evidence to try him.				

=== China ===
Date of crime	Defendant(s)	Crime	Location	Sentence	Time served	Legally exonerated
1987	Teng Xingshan	Rape, robbery and murder*	Hunan, China	Death sentence	Executed	Yes, posthumously
1987	Teng Xingshan	Teng Xingshan, a butcher, was convicted (the court was told "Teng confessed his crime on his initiative and his confession conforms with scientific inspection and identification") and executed in 1989 for the murder of Shi Xiaorong, a waitress who had disappeared. Shi reappeared in Shandong in 1993 and said she had never met Teng. Teng was posthumously acquitted in 2006.				
1993	Zhang Yuhuan	Murder	Jinxian, Jiangxi province	Death, commuted to life imprisonment	27 years	Yes
1993	Zhang Yuhuan	Zhang Yuhuan maintained he was tortured by police and forced to confess to the murder of two young boys in 1993. In March 2019 the high court agreed to retry the case and in July provincial prosecutors recommended that Zhang be acquitted based on insufficient evidence. He walked free in August 2020. The killer of the two boys in 1993 remains unknown.				
1994	She Xianglin	Murder*	Yanmenkou Township, Hubei Province	Death, later 15 years	11 years	Yes
1994	She Xianglin	Zhang Zaiyu disappeared from her village in January 1994. Zhang's husband She Xianglin had been having an affair and confessed to murdering Zhang after being interrogated, a confession he later claimed was made under torture. She was sentenced to death in December 1994; he was later given a new trial in 1998 which also convicted him, but was spared the death sentence this time around and re-sentenced to 15 years in prison. In 2005 Zhang Zaiyu was found alive. DNA testing confirmed her identity and She was released one month later.				
1995	Nie Shubin	Rape and murder	Zhang Ying village, Hubei province	Death sentence	Executed	Yes, posthumously
1995	Nie Shubin	Nie Shubin was convicted after the police had obtained a confession from him with a week of "skillful interrogation, including psychological warfare" and executed in 1995 for the rape and murder of Kang Juhua, a woman in her thirties. In 2005, Wang Shujin admitted to the police that he had committed the murder and described murder scene details only known to the police.				
1996	Huugjilt	Rape and murder	Inner Mongolia	Death sentence	Executed	Yes, posthumously
1996	Huugjilt	A young Chinese national executed for the rape and murder of some young people. Unable to find the offender, the local police arrested Huugjilt instead, who was the first to discover and report the case, and obtained his testimony by torture. He was declared innocent after the real culprit, Zhao Zhihong (赵志红), who was executed in 2015, admitted the crime. Huugjilt's family was compensated 2.05 million yuan (equivalent to US$298,000) by Inner Mongolia High People's Court.				
2001	Chen Keyun	Bombing that killed one person	Fuqing, China	Death sentence (twice)	12 years	Yes
2001	Chen Keyun	Chen (and five others) was arrested by the police after a bomb went off outside a government office that investigates officials for corruption as Chen had previously been investigated by the office. Chen was tortured by beating, starvation, dangling by his wrists from bars on a high window and deprivation of sleep and signed a forced confession. The others were also tortured. Chen was convicted and sentenced to death and the others got prison sentences. After several appeals in 2013 the Fuzhou provincial court acquitted Chen and the others and offered to pay 4.2 million Yuan (about $690,000).				

=== Finland ===
Date of crime	Defendant(s)	Crime	Location	Sentence	Time served	Legally exonerated
2006	Anneli Auer	Murder	Ulvila	Life imprisonment	1.6 years	Yes
2006	Anneli Auer	In December 2006, Jukka S. Lahti was murdered in what became known as the Ulvila homicide case. His wife, Anneli Auer, was arrested for his murder in 2009. She was convicted in 2010 and sentenced to life imprisonment. An appeals court overturned her conviction. In 2012, the Supreme Court ordered the case retried after prosecutors presented new evidence. In December 2013, she was convicted and sentenced to life imprisonment for a second time. An appeals court again overturned the verdict. Prosecutors appealed the acquittal to the Supreme Court, which upheld the acquittal. She was granted €545,000 in compensation, and filed an unsuccessful claim for €2.5 million in compensation.				

=== France ===
Date of crime	Defendant(s)	Crime	Location	Sentence	Time served	Legally exonerated
1431	Joan of Arc	Heresy and cross-dressing	Rouen, France	Death sentence, burning at stake	Executed	Yes, posthumously
1431	Joan of Arc	Joan of Arc was executed in 1431 on charges of heresy. She was posthumously cleared in 1456.				
October 14, 1761	Jean Calas	Murder of his son, Marc-Antoine	Toulouse, France	Death sentence, breaking wheel	Executed	Yes, posthumously
October 14, 1761	Jean Calas	Jean Calas from Toulouse was executed on March 10, 1762, for murder of his son Marc Antoine. The philosopher Voltaire, convinced of his innocence, succeeded in reopening of the case and rehabilitation of Jean in 1765.				
August 6–7, 1781	Marie Salmon	Murder	Caen	Death sentence, burning at stake	4 years	Yes
August 6–7, 1781	Marie Salmon	Salmon, a young domestic servant, was accused of poisoning several members of her employer's household, one of whom died. She was sentenced to be burned at the stake. However, her execution was delayed after she falsely claimed to be pregnant. During the delay, famous lawyers Pierre Noël Lecauchois and Jean-François Fournel took up the case. The lawyers were able to show that the investigation into the crime was heavily flawed, and that the most damning evidence against Salmon was most likely planted by the victim's family. Salmon was eventually given a new trial before the Parlement of Paris and was cleared of all charges.				
1894	Alfred Dreyfus	Treason		Life imprisonment on Devil's Island in French Guiana	4 years	Yes
1894	Alfred Dreyfus	Alfred Dreyfus was wrongly convicted for treason in 1894. After being imprisoned on Devil's Island, he was proven innocent with the assistance of Émile Zola and definitively rehabilitated only in 1906. See the Dreyfus affair.				
March 10, 1915	Louis Girard, Lucien Lechat, Théophile Maupas, Louis Lefoulon	Cowardice before the enemy	Souain, Marne	Death	Executed	Yes, posthumously
March 10, 1915	Louis Girard, Lucien Lechat, Théophile Maupas, Louis Lefoulon	Four soldiers executed after a court-martial convicted them of refusing to go "over the top" during a bayonet charge. The charges were posthumously dismissed in 1934.				
April 30, 1987	Patrick Dils	Murder of two children, Cyril Beining and Alexandre Beckrich	Montigny-lès-Metz, France	Life imprisonment	15 years	Yes
April 30, 1987	Patrick Dils	Dils' conviction was overturned and he was acquitted on retrial in 2002.				
2001	17 persons	Child abuse		Imprisonment		Yes
2001	17 persons	In 2005, thirteen people were finally proven innocent of child molestation after having served four years in prison. A fourteenth died in prison. Only four people were proven guilty. This infamous case, which deeply shook public opinion, is known as the Affaire d'Outreau, the Outreau case, from the name of the city where the victims lived.				
December 2001	Marc Machin	Murder	Neuilly-sur-Seine near Paris	Imprisonment	11 years	Yes
December 2001	Marc Machin	In 2001, 45-year-old Marie-Agnès Bedot was murdered by stabbing. Nineteen-year-old Marc Machin was convicted of the murder based on circumstantial evidence and a forced confession. In 2008 David Sagno, a homeless man, admitted murdering Bedot and the police found Sagno's DNA on Bedot's clothes. Machin's conviction was quashed and he was cleared in 2012.				

=== Germany ===
Date of crime	Defendant(s)	Crime	Location	Sentence	Time served	Legally exonerated
1935—1940	Leo Katzenberger	Racial defilement*	Nuremberg	Death	Executed	No
1935—1940	Leo Katzenberger	Katzenberger, who was Jewish, was accused of committing racial crimes under the anti-Semitic Nuremberg Laws by having an affair with a non-Jewish acquaintance named Irene Seiler. Seiler and Katzenberger both denied the accusations, and the only evidence was the testimony of a single witness who saw Katzenberger leaving Seiler's house after dark. Katzenberger was executed after a show trial presided over by Oswald Rothaug, a notoriously biased judge who was later found guilty of war crimes for his involvement in the case.				
March 1942	Irene Seiler	Perjury*	Nuremberg	2 years	2 years	No
March 1942	Irene Seiler	A German woman who was accused of having an affair with the above Leo Katzenberger, in violation of the Nuremberg Laws. She was convicted of perjury after making a sworn statement that the charges against Katzenberger were false. Modern historians consider her to be innocent.				
October 13, 2001	Hermine Rupp, her two daughters, and her daughter's fiancé	Murder of Rudolf Rupp, husband of Hermine Rupp*	Neuburg an der Donau, Bavaria	8 1/2 years	5 years	February 25, 2011
October 13, 2001	Hermine Rupp, her two daughters, and her daughter's fiancé	Rudolf Rupp disappeared on his way back from the local pub one night in October 2001. Local rumors spread that the Rupp family killed the unlikeable Rudy, who had a history of drinking excessively and fighting. Police had no evidence in the case, but eventually coerced confessions from the family that they had bludgeoned him, dismembered him, and fed him to the dogs. No physical evidence was found, but they were convicted based on confessions that even contradicted each other. In 2009, Rupp's body was found behind the wheel of his Mercedes in the Danube river in an apparent car accident. Though the corpse suffered by fish feeding on it, there was no evidence of a crime.				
August 28, 2001	Horst Arnold	Rape*	Reichelsheim	5 years	5 years	July 5, 2011
August 28, 2001	Horst Arnold	Horst Arnold was a sports and biology teacher at the August Zinn comprehensive school in Reichelsheim. He was accused by a female colleague, Heidi K., of having raped her, and based on her testimony he was sentenced to five years of prison. Only after he was freed, an equal opportunity commissioner (who, at first, supported Heidi K. before and during the trial) noticed several contradictions in her stories. In prison, Arnold continued to deny the crime and refused therapy sessions, which was why he was denied early leave on parole. In the retrial, Arnold was exonerated, and in 2013, Heidi K. was sentenced to five years and six months.				
October 28, 2008	Manfred Genditzki	Murder*	Rottach-Egern, Bavaria	Life imprisonment	13 years	Yes
October 28, 2008	Manfred Genditzki	Genditzki was accused of murdering his elderly employer, Lieselotte Kortüm, who was found dead in her bathtub. Her cause of death was initially assumed to be an accidental fall, but medical examiners later changed their mind and decided she was murdered. Genditzki was convicted of her murder twice and both times sentenced to life in prison. He was released pending appeal in 2022 after a new investigation concluded there was no evidence Kortüm was murdered, and was found not guilty at his third trial the following year.				

=== Greece ===
Date of crime	Defendant(s)	Crime	Location	Sentence	Time served	Legally exonerated
1922 (AD)	D. Gounaris, G. Baltatzis, N. Stratos, N. Theotokis and P. Protopapadakis (Trial of the Six)	High Treason	Athens, Greece	Death sentence	Executed	Yes, posthumously
1922 (AD)	D. Gounaris, G. Baltatzis, N. Stratos, N. Theotokis and P. Protopapadakis (Trial of the Six)	In 2010, Greek courts reversed the convictions for high treason of the six.				

=== Iceland ===
Date of crime	Defendant(s)	Crime	Location	Sentence	Time served	Legally exonerated
1974	Sævar Ciesielski, Kristjan Vídar Vídarsson, Tryggvi Rúnar Leifsson, Albert Klahn Skaftason, Guðjón Skarphéðinsson and Erla Bolladóttir	Murder of Guðmundur and Geirfinnur	Hafnarfjörður and Keflavík, near Reykjavík Iceland	Two life sentences; the other four got 15 months to 16 years (sentences reduced in 1980)	All served their time in jail	Yes
1974	Sævar Ciesielski, Kristjan Vídar Vídarsson, Tryggvi Rúnar Leifsson, Albert Klahn Skaftason, Guðjón Skarphéðinsson and Erla Bolladóttir	Two men, Guðmundur and Geirfinnur, disappeared in January and November 1974. The Icelandic police were convinced that the six suspects were complicit in the murder of these two men although there were no bodies, witnesses or forensic evidence. The police subjected the suspects to intense and lengthy interrogations (including two that had over 600 days in solitary confinement, water torture, sleep deprivation and drugs). Most Icelanders believed the six were innocent. The BBC described this as "... one of the most shocking miscarriages of justice Europe has ever witnessed."				

=== Iran ===
Date of crime	Defendant(s)	Crime	Location	Sentence	Time served	Legally exonerated
2004	Atefah Sahaaleh	Adultery and "crimes against chastity"*	Neka, Iran	Death by hanging	Executed	Yes, posthumously
2004	Atefah Sahaaleh	Sahaaleh was convicted for "crimes against chastity" for being involved in a sexual relationship with a 51-year-old married man named Ali Darabi. Sahaaleh claimed she was raped by Darabi multiple times over the course of 3 years and then tortured into confessing. During her trial, she removed her hijab, an act seen as severe contempt of court, and argued that Darabi should be punished, not her. The judge sentenced her to death. Darabi was sentenced to 95 lashes. Unbeknownst to her parents, documents presented to the Supreme Court of Appeal described her as 22 years old. Her birth certificate indicated her age was 16. Amnesty International and other organizations declared her execution to be a crime against humanity and against children of the world.				

=== Ireland ===
Date of crime	Defendant(s)	Crime	Location	Sentence	Time served	Legally exonerated
1882	Maolra Seoighe, known in English as Myles Joyce	Murder	Maamtrasna, Ireland	Death	Executed	Yes, posthumously
1882	Maolra Seoighe, known in English as Myles Joyce	Joyce was one of three people condemned to death for the murder of a local family in Ireland, which was part of the United Kingdom at the time. Joyce spoke no English, his lawyer spoke no Irish, perjured witnesses were bribed, evidence withheld, and most scholars have regarded the verdict as a miscarriage of justice. In 2018 the President of Ireland issued a pardon and said "Maolra Seoighe was wrongly convicted of murder and was hanged for a crime that he did not commit."				
January 8, 1990	Nora Wall	Rape*	Dublin	Life	4 days	Yes
January 8, 1990	Nora Wall	Wall was convicted on the basis of false allegations by Regina Walsh (psychiatric history) and Patricia Phelan (history of false accusations). The first woman in the history of the Irish State to be convicted of rape, the first person to receive a life sentence for rape and the only person in the history of the state to be convicted on repressed memory evidence.				
March 31, 1976	Sallins Train Robbery four	Mail train robbery	Sallins, County Kildare	9 to 12 years	4 years	Yes
March 31, 1976	Sallins Train Robbery four	Osgur Breatnach, Nicky Kelly, Brian Mcnally, Michael Plunkett, John Fitzpatrick were arrested and beaten by the Garda Síochána to extract confessions under duress from four (Plunkett did not sign). The four were found guilty with no other evidence apart from the confessions. Breatnach and McNally were acquitted on appeal on the grounds that their statements had been taken under duress. Kelly was given a presidential pardon and received £750,000 in compensation.				

=== Israel ===
Date of crime	Defendant(s)	Crime	Location	Sentence	Time served	Legally exonerated
1933	Abraham Stavsky	Assassination of Haim Arlosoroff	Tel Aviv	Death	One year	Yes
1933	Abraham Stavsky	Stavsky was one of three Revisionists tried for the murder of Haim Arlosoroff, a prominent leader of the Mapai party. Stavsky was the only one who was convicted, based on the testimony of Arlosoroff's wife Sima who identified Stavsky as the man who had blinded Arlosoroff with a torch before the other attacker shot him. A year after his conviction, Stavsky was acquitted on technical grounds as the law required that there be evidence other than the single eyewitness; although the court stated its belief that Stavsky was guilty, a commission of inquiry into the murder later concluded that he was innocent. Stavsky was killed during the Altalena Affair in 1948.				
1942–1945	John Demjanjuk	Crimes against humanity	Treblinka extermination camp	Death	Five years	Yes (Note: Demjanjuk was specifically accused and convicted of having committed atrocities at the Treblinka extermination camp. This was disproved and his conviction was overturned; however, Demjanjuk was later implicated in atrocities at the Sobibor extermination camp, for which he would be prosecuted in Germany in the 2000s.)
1942–1945	John Demjanjuk	John Demjanjuk, a Ukrainian living in the United States, was extradited to Israel in 1986 to stand trial for his alleged participation in the Holocaust as a Trawniki man at the Treblinka extermination camp. Several survivors identified Demjanjuk as "Ivan the Terrible", a notoriously sadistic Ukrainian guard at Treblinka who had been in charge of the gas chambers. Demjanjuk's defence was that the eyewitnesses were mistaken and he had never worked at Treblinka. Demjanjuk was given the death penalty. The Israeli Supreme Court acquitted him on appeal in 1993 after it was revealed that the prosecution had withheld evidence proving Ivan the Terrible was another Ukrainian named Ivan Marchenko; however, during the appeals process evidence surfaced revealing that Demjanjuk had been a guard at Sobibor extermination camp. The Supreme Court refused to allow Demjanjuk to be tried for his crimes at Sobibor, but he was later convicted in a German court in 2011; Demjanjuk died the following year while still appealing the verdict, leaving the case unresolved.				
1948	Meir Tobianski	Treason		Death	Executed	Yes, posthumously
1948	Meir Tobianski	In June 1948, during the 1948 Arab–Israeli War, Meir Tobianski, a major in the Israeli army, was arrested on charges of spying for the Jordanians. The Chief Military Prosecutor's order to detain and interrogate Tobianski for 10 days was ignored; instead, he was subjected to a drumhead court-martial. He was found guilty on circumstantial evidence, sentenced to death, and executed by firing squad on June 30, 1948. Later, an investigation resulted in Tobianski's posthumous acquittal. Intelligence chief Isser Be'eri, who was largely responsible for Tobianski's execution, was later put on trial and found guilty of manslaughter.				
1974	Amos Baranes	Murder	Haifa District, between Caesarea and Or Akiva	Life imprisonment	8 1/2 years	Yes
1974	Amos Baranes	In January 1976, Amos Baranes was convicted for the 1974 murder of soldier Rachel Heller and was sentenced to life imprisonment. He had approached the police and told them he had known the victim, intending to offer his help any way he could, but he then became a suspect and was arrested. He was convicted of murder and sentenced to life imprisonment. His conviction was based solely on a confession and reenaction he provided to police, which he later retracted, claiming that the police had extracted the confession out of him by physically abusing him and depriving him of sleep for four days. An appeal to the Israeli Supreme Court was rejected, although errors in the investigation were acknowledged. In 1980, Ezra Goldberg, a retired policeman concluded that Baranes was innocent. He gave the information to Judge Haim Cohn, one of the Supreme Court judges who had rejected his appeal. Cohn concluded that his judgement had been wrong, and suggested Baranes ask for a pardon. Baranes refused, claiming that such a request would be an admission of a crime he did not commit. Cohn then asked President Chaim Herzog to grant Baranes a pardon. Baranes was finally released in June 1983 after receiving a presidential pardon. He had served 8 1/2 years of his sentence. Following his release, Baranes continued his struggle to clear his name. Three times his requests for a new trial were denied. In March 2002, Supreme Court Justice Dalia Dorner finally ruled that Baranes should get a new trial. Four weeks later, Judge Cohn died. His last phone conversation was with Justice Dorner; he called her from his sickbed and thanked her for fixing the injustice "that I did". Baranes was one of the people who carried Cohn's coffin at his funeral. In December 2002, the court acquitted Baranes—without hearing evidence and without deciding whether Baranes committed the crime after the prosecution decided not to have a trial. In 2003, Baranes was awarded NIS1.4 million in compensation. On August 5, 2010, he was awarded a further NIS5,029,000 in compensation. Amos Baranes died in September 2011. A suspect in the murder of Rachel Heller was arrested in 2019.				
Late 1970s	Azat Naffso	Treason and espionage	Kfar Shuba	18 years' imprisonment	7 years	Partially
Late 1970s	Azat Naffso	In 1980, Azat Naffso, a former military intelligence officer of Circassian origin, was arrested for espionage, after it was discovered that one of his contacts in Lebanon had been a double agent for Fatah. Naffso was interrogated and subjected to various forms of torture to extract a confession. After 14 days, Naffso confessed, and was tried before a military court in 1981, convicted, and sentenced to 18 years in prison. In 1987, he appealed to the Supreme Court, arguing that his confession had been extracted illegally and that the prosecution had presented fabricated evidence. The Supreme Court judges cleared Naffso of most of the charges and sharply criticized Naffso's interrogators, accused them of perjury, and of not taking reasonable measures during his interrogation. A plea bargain was reached, under which Naffso agreed to plead guilty to exceeding authority creating a national security risk. Naffso's sentence was reduced to 2 years and a demotion to the rank of Sergeant, and as a result, he was released immediately. The Naffso affair was one of the reasons the Landau Commission, set up to investigate methods used by Shin Bet, the Israeli internal security service, was set up. Naffso subsequently filed a compensation claim against the state, and reached a compromise under which he would be given $1 million in compensation and pledge not to publicly reveal details of the case.				
c. 1991 – c. 1994	Arnoldo Lazorovsky	Sodomy against a minor and committing an indecent act	Sharon region	6 years	6 years	Yes
c. 1991 – c. 1994	Arnoldo Lazorovsky	In 2000, Arnoldo Lazorovsky was convicted of sexually assaulting a minor while working as a janitor at the Kfar Saba Country Club between 1991 and 1994, and was sentenced to six years in prison, after being accused by a young man several years after the alleged crimes occurred. Soon afterward, Gregory Schneider, who had worked at the same country club, was convicted of similar crimes after being accused by the same person, but the conviction was overturned upon appeal. As a result, Lazorovsky requested and was granted a retrial, but was convicted again, after which he appealed to the Israeli Supreme Court, which overturned the conviction.				
1998	Moshe Zagury	Murder, arson, and robbery		Life imprisonment	5 years	Yes
1998	Moshe Zagury	Moshe Zagury was convicted of murdering money changer Ephraim Yass by the Haifa District Court in October 1998 after a state witness testified against him in exchange for having a narcotics charge dropped. He was sentenced to 11 years' imprisonment and 3 years' probation. An appeal to the Supreme Court was rejected, and the Supreme Court increased his sentence to life imprisonment. In 2004, the Supreme Court overturned his conviction.				
2002	Elisha Haibatov	Murder, robbery, conspiracy to commit a crime	Negev region	Life imprisonment	12 years	Yes
2002	Elisha Haibatov	Elisha Haibatov was arrested in January 2006 for the 2002 murder of cashier Shai Edri in Sderot, who was killed in the course of a robbery. He was already serving a prison sentence for torching his own home and threatening his partner at the time. He was convicted in 2007 and sentenced to life imprisonment. In 2018, after he had served 12 years in prison, the Israeli Supreme Court overturned his convictions for murder, robbery, and conspiracy to commit a crime, but upheld his convictions for witness tampering, obstruction of justice, and violating a legal order. His sentence was reduced to 3 years, and as a result he was released immediately.				
2007	Hamed Zinati	Murder	Abu Snan	Life imprisonment	4 years	Yes
2007	Hamed Zinati	In 2007, Hamed Zinati, a Druze land broker from Abu Snan, was arrested for the murder of Youssef Ali, who had been married to a woman who had had an affair with one of his business partners. He was convicted on the basis of a confession that the police had extracted from a third suspect. The Israeli Supreme Court overturned his conviction on appeal after he spent four years in prison. The Supreme Court sharply criticized his conviction, ruling that the court's reliance on a confession extracted under questionable circumstances was the blackest of moral stains on the Israeli justice system. He was awarded $100,000 in compensation.				
2002	Roman Zdorov	Murder	Katzrin, Golan Heights	Life imprisonment	13 years	Yes
2002	Roman Zdorov	Roman Zdorov, a maintenance man, was arrested for the murder of Tair Rada in 2006. He was tried in the Nazareth District Court and convicted of her murder in 2010, and sentenced to life imprisonment. The case generated widespread attention and controversy among the Israeli public, with many critical of the police's conduct in carrying out the investigation and doubting Zdorov's guilt, among them Tair Rada's mother. The case was featured in the Israeli true crime documentary series Shadow of Truth. In 2013, the Israeli Supreme Court returned the case to the district court for retrial. Zdorov was again convicted in 2014 and the Israeli Supreme Court rejected his appeal the following year. In 2021, the Israeli Supreme Court again ordered a retrial and released Zdorov to house arrest. In 2023, Roman Zdorov was acquitted on retrial.				

=== Italy ===
Date of crime	Defendant(s)	Crime	Location	Sentence	Time served	Legally exonerated
1969	Pietro Valpreda	Piazza Fontana bombing	Milan, near the Duomo di Milano	4 1/2 years, for the charges of "subversive association", only (not directly for the bombing)	3 years pre-trial (while awaiting legal proceedings)	Yes
1969	Pietro Valpreda	Pietro Valpreda, an anarchist condemned for the 1969 Piazza Fontana bombing, was finally found innocent sixteen years later. He was framed since it was planned to blame the crime on the radical left, while it was committed by neo-fascist groups as the first step of the strategy of tension.				
1976	Giuseppe Gulotta	Two Carabinieri shot dead	Alcamo Marina, Trapani, Italy	Life	22 years	Yes
1976	Giuseppe Gulotta	Convicted for the killing of two Carabinieri, released when another Carabiniere revealed that the confession had been obtained through torture.				
1983	Enzo Tortora	Drug trafficking; association with Camorra		10 years	7 months pre-trial + post-conviction house arrest of 8 1/2 months	Yes
1983	Enzo Tortora	Enzo Tortora, a popular anchorman on national RAI television, was arrested in 1983 and held in jail for months on trumped-up charges by several pentiti of the Camorra and other people already known for perjury. It was soon noted that this was most likely a mis-identification due to confusion with a man having the same surname (meaning "turtledove"), but the pentiti kept on accusing Tortora of the gravest offenses related to drug dealing. He was sentenced to ten years in jail in his first trial held in 1985. Tortora was spared further incarceration at this time due to intervention from the Radical Party, which offered him a candidacy to the European Parliament. Tortora won election in two constituencies, despite the country being divided between those who held him guilty and those who held him innocent. He resigned as a MEP in December 1985, renouncing his parliamentary immunity. Tortora was then placed under house arrest until he was completely acquitted and rehabilitated by the Court of Appeal in September 1986. He returned the next year to his work in TV to a moving comeback in his Portobello show, only to die in 1988 from cancer and become an icon of battles against injustice and a perpetual reminder of a grave public blunder of the Italian judiciary system.				
1992	Daniele Barillà	Drug trafficking	Liguria	18 years	7 1/2 years	Yes
1992	Daniele Barillà	Daniele Barillà, an entrepreneur mistakenly identified as a major drug cartel boss in Milan, spent more than 7 years in jail from 1992 to 1999, despite growing evidence of his complete innocence and non-involvement in any criminal activity. He has been awarded €4,000,000 for unjust incarceration.				
February 14, 2004	Fabio Carlino	Homicide resulting from the commission of another crime; illegal supply of drugs	Rimini	4 1/2 years; fine; financial compensation to family of victim		Yes
February 14, 2004	Fabio Carlino	Fabio Carlino was convicted of selling the dose of ultra-pure cocaine that killed cyclist Marco Pantani, and sentenced to 4 1/2 years in prison. He was also ordered to pay a fine of £19,000, and another £300,000 in damages to Pantani's family. His conviction was overturned by the Italian Court of Cassation in 2011.				
November 1, 2007	Amanda Knox and Raffaele Sollecito	Murder of Meredith Kercher	Perugia, Italy	26 years' imprisonment (Knox); 25 years' imprisonment (Sollecito)	3 years	Yes
November 1, 2007	Amanda Knox and Raffaele Sollecito	London-born Kercher was studying in Italy when she was found murdered in the home she shared with Knox. Knox, who was from Seattle, her Italian boyfriend, Raffaele Sollecito, and Ivorian-born Rudy Guede were charged with the murder. Forensic evidence, including DNA from feces at the scene and fingerprints linked Guede to the scene, but the cases against Knox and Sollecito were controversial. Knox and Kercher were acquainted with Guede, but Knox and Sollecito claim they were at Sollecito's house at the time of the murder. Prosecutors argued Kercher was killed as part of a sex game gone wrong. In 2015, the Supreme Court of Cassation overturned the previous guilty verdicts, definitively ending the case. Rather than merely declaring that there were errors in the earlier court cases or that there was not enough evidence to convict, the court ruled that Knox and Sollecito had not committed the murder and were innocent of those charges. According to Vedova, the decision by the five judges was almost unprecedented. Guede's conviction still stands.				
March 12 - April 8, 2014	Daniela Poggiali	Murder*	Lugo, Emilia-Romagna	Life	Five years	Yes
March 12 - April 8, 2014	Daniela Poggiali	Hospice nurse Poggiali was convicted of murdering an elderly patient, 78-year-old Rosa Calderoni. The case against her was based on statistical evidence which supposedly linked Poggiali to the deaths of dozens of patients on the ward, and forensics purporting to show that Calderoni was murdered with an overdose of potassium. Statistician Richard D. Gill later demonstrated that the statistics did not link Poggiali to a suspicious number of deaths, and the forensic evidence was likewise shown to be heavily flawed. Poggiali was acquitted on appeal, with the court finding that Calderoni had died from natural causes. After her acquittal Poggiali was charged with murdering another patient who had died the month before Calderoni, but in 2023 she was once again acquitted on appeal.				

=== Japan ===
Date of crime	Defendant(s)	Crime	Location	Sentence	Time served	Legally exonerated
December 30, 1948	Sakae Menda	Double murder	Japan	Death	35 years	Yes
December 30, 1948	Sakae Menda	Sakae Menda was convicted for a double murder in 1948, after police extracted a confession by denying him food, water, and sleep, and subjecting him to physical abuse. He was sentenced to death, and spent 35 years on death row before being cleared in 1983, after further evidence backing up his alibi came to light.				
August 17, 1949	Twenty defendants	Matsukawa derailment	Fukushima Prefecture	Varied	Varied	Yes
August 17, 1949	Twenty defendants	Three people were killed when a Tōhoku Main Line locomotive derailed en route to Ueno Station in August 1949. The cause was ruled to be sabotage and twenty defendants were initially convicted in 1950. Three of the convicts were acquitted on appeal five years later. The remaining seventeen were given a retrial in 1959; it was discovered that the prosecution had suppressed evidence, including alibis for some of the accused and forensic testing which showed that tools linked to the defendants could not have been used in the sabotage. All accused were found not guilty at their retrial in 1961.				
June 30, 1966	Iwao Hakamada	Quadruple murder	Shizuoka Prefecture	Death	56 years	Yes
June 30, 1966	Iwao Hakamada	Iwao Hakamada, the world's longest-serving death row inmate, was convicted of a quadruple murder in which one of his bosses was stabbed to death alongside his wife and children and their house was burned down during a robbery. Hakamada confessed to the crime after being beaten and denied food and water by the police. Five items of clothing covered in the victim's blood were also found in a miso tank at the factory where Hakamada worked. Hakamada was granted a retrial in 2014 after DNA testing on the clothes revealed the perpetrator's DNA was not his; however, he was not officially found not guilty until 2024, 56 years after his conviction.				
1997	Govinda Prasad Mainali	Murder of Yasuko Watanabe	Tokyo, Japan	Life	15 years	Yes
1997	Govinda Prasad Mainali	In 1997 a Japanese female employee of Tokyo Electric Power Co. was murdered in her apartment in Tokyo. Mainali, a Nepalese migrant worker, knew the woman and lived nearby. The police arrested Mainali who was physically abused (beaten, kicked, head banged against the wall) by officers and was not allowed a lawyer. He was convicted of murder and sentenced to life. He appealed the conviction on the grounds that DNA evidence at the scene (semen, body hair, under the dead woman's fingernails) were not his and was acquitted in 2012.				
1990	Toshikazu Sugaya	Four-year-old girl kidnapped and murdered (The Ashikaga murder case, part of the North Kanto Serial Young Girl Kidnapping and Murder Case)	Kanto region, Japan	Life	17 years	Yes
1990	Toshikazu Sugaya	Sugaya was found guilty based on flawed DNA testing and a confession that he professes was beaten out of him by detective in charge of the case Fumio Hashimoto. Investigation by reporter Kiyoshi Shimizu into the North Kanto Serial Young Girl Kidnapping and Murder Case resulted in the Ashikaga case being found to be part of it, with Sugaya being innocent. It was later found that the prosecution had also suppressed evidence regarding the true culprit, including eyewitness accounts, because they did not match their version of events with Sugaya as the culprit.				

=== Malaysia ===
Date of crime	Defendant(s)	Crime	Location	Sentence	Time served	Legally exonerated
August 1, 1980	Karthigesu Sivapakiam	Murder of Jean Perera Sinnappa	Subang, Selangor	Death	9 months	Yes
August 1, 1980	Karthigesu Sivapakiam	Karthigesu was found guilty of the murder of Jean Perera Sinnappa, a former beauty queen and teacher who was found with multiple stab wounds. He was sentenced to death by hanging. In May 1981, a key prosecution witness confessed to lying about Karthigesu's threat to kill Jean Perera. Karthigesu was acquitted after the Federal Court of Malaysia allowed his appeal, and the witness was subsequently jailed for perjury.				
August 30, 2010	R. Mathan	Banting murders	Tanjung Sepat, Selangor	Death	Four years	Yes
August 30, 2010	R. Mathan	Mathan was a labourer employed by wealthy lawyer N. Pathmanabhan at his farm in Tanjung Sepat. On 30 August 2010, cosmetics millionaire Sosilawati Lawiya and three of her companions disappeared after leaving to meet Pathmanabhan about a land deal. It later transpired that they had been murdered and their bodies burnt on Pathmanabhan's farm. Pathmanabhan and three of his employees, including Mathan, were convicted of the murders. Four years later the Federal Court acquitted Mathan, ruling that none of the evidence linked him to the murder, but upheld the convictions of the other three defendants.				

=== Mexico ===
Date of crime	Defendant(s)	Crime	Location	Sentence	Time served	Legally exonerated
March 2006	Jacinta Francisco Marcial	Kidnapping and ransom of Federal Investigations Agents	Santiago Mexquititlán, Querétaro	21 years in prison	3 years	
March 2006	Jacinta Francisco Marcial	In March 2006, six plainclothes agents of Mexico's Federal Investigations Agency (AFI) raided a market in Santiago Mexquititlán, Querétaro, in search of unauthorized copies of copyrighted works. During the raid, the six AFI agents were cornered by a number of unarmed vendors in protest. The agents later claimed that the vendors demanded a ransom to let them go. Local witnesses to the incident denied any ransom demand was made. Jacinta Francisco Marcial, an indigenous Otomí woman, sold ice cream in Santiago Mexquititlán's predominantly indigenous tianguis. The six AFI agents who conducted the raid implicated Francisco Marcial after they were shown a newspaper photograph depicting her walking near a group of protesting vendors. In August 2006, four months after the raid, she was arrested for the alleged kidnapping. She was later convicted and sentenced to 21 years' imprisonment. Two other women were convicted as well. Amnesty International denounced Francisco Marcial's imprisonment as resulting from a wrongful prosecution. The group declared her a prisoner of conscience, claiming there was no credible evidence against her, and that she had been prosecuted because of her gender, poverty, race, and inability to speak or understand the Spanish language. In 2009, prosecutors dropped the case against Francisco Marcial and she was released. The two other women convicted of the same charges, Alberta Alcántara and Teresa González, had their convictions reversed by the Mexican Supreme Court in April 2010 and were also released from prison.				

=== Netherlands ===
Date of crime	Defendant(s)	Crime	Location	Sentence	Time served	Legally exonerated
1986	Ina Post	Murder and robbery	Netherlands	Life	4 years	Yes
1986	Ina Post	Post was a carer for an 89-year-old woman who was strangled and robbed. She "seemed nervous" when questioned and under forceful police questioning she confessed although later retracted. Post's alibi was not verified, another nearby similar crime that Post could not have done was ignored and there was no corroborating evidence. She was released from prison in 1990. The Dutch Appeal Court acquitted Post in 2010 and the Dutch Prosecutor admitted he was wrong.				
1994	Wilco Viets, Herman Dubois	Murder	Putten	10 years	6 years	Yes
1994	Wilco Viets, Herman Dubois	The Putten murder case (1994): in this case, the 23-year-old flight attendant Christel Ambrosius was found murdered in her grandmother's house, which was remotely located in the Veluwe. The police arrested four men who had been in those woods that weekend. Even though sperm found did not match the DNA of any of the four men, Wilco Viets and Herman Dubois were convicted to 10 years' imprisonment anyway, of which they only served two-thirds for good behavior. In April 2002, the Dutch high council (Supreme court) declared both men innocent, shortly after they had completed their sentences. Another suspect was apprehended in May 2008, based on a DNA match.				
22 June 2000	Cees Borsboom	Child sexual abuse and murder, another attempted murder	Schiedam	18 years, psychiatric treatment	4 years	Partially
22 June 2000	Cees Borsboom	In 2000 Nienke Kleiss was murdered in the Beatrix park from Schiedam. The suspect called the police for finding a body. An under-age witness was abused during police interrogation in order to provide incriminating evidence. The suspect has falsely confessed to committing the crime, but has recanted such confession. He was sentenced in 2002 to 18 years' imprisonment and mandatory psychiatric treatment. In 2004 it became apparent that Wik H. was the real culprit. DNA evidence also cleared Borsboom. His jail time was interrupted and eventually he was partially rehabilitated, though not declared innocent. As a result of the scandal, Commission Posthumus was created in order to review possible wrongful convictions.				
2001	Lucia de Berk	7 murders*	The Hague	life	6 1/2 years	Yes
2001	Lucia de Berk	Lucia de Berk: was sentenced to life imprisonment in 2003 for four murders and three attempted murders of patients in her care. After an appeal, she was convicted in 2004 of seven murders and three attempts. In October 2008, the case was reopened by the Dutch supreme court, as new facts had been uncovered that undermined the previous verdicts. De Berk was freed, and her case was re-tried; she was exonerated in April 2010.				

=== New Zealand ===
In the 2010s, public interest in addressing the possibility of wrongful convictions as a system issue led to the establishment of the Criminal Cases Review Commission in 2019. In the decade since 2013, it was revealed that nearly 900 New Zealanders have had their convictions overturned. The following cases are the only ones where the Government has paid compensation for a wrongful conviction, except for Peter Ellis who died before the Supreme Court in New Zealand overturned his convictions, and Rex Haig who died while still appealing for compensation. Notably, in New Zealand, there is no right to compensation for wrongful convictions or false imprisonment.

Date of crime	Defendant(s)	Crime	Location	Sentence	Time served	Legally exonerated
June 17, 1970 (circa)	Arthur Allan Thomas	Murders of Harvey and Jeanette Crewe	Pukekawa, Waikato	Life imprisonment	9 years	Yes—paid compensation
June 17, 1970 (circa)	Arthur Allan Thomas	Arthur Allan Thomas, a New Zealand farmer, was twice convicted of the June 1970 murders of Harvey and Jeanette Crewe. He spent 9 years in prison but was given a Royal Pardon and was released and awarded $950,000 in compensation for wrongful convictions. A Royal Commission in 1980 found that the prosecution cases were flawed and that after firing Thomas' impounded rifle, police had planted a cartridge case in the Crewes' garden to incriminate him, and ignored evidence that pointed to another suspect. The prosecution had also denied alibi and witness information to the defence team.				
May 1, 1986 to October 1, 1992	Peter Ellis	Sexual abuse of children at Christchurch Civic Creche*	Christchurch	10 years' imprisonment	7 years	Yes
May 1, 1986 to October 1, 1992	Peter Ellis	Peter Ellis was convicted in 1993 on 16 counts of sexual offending involving children in his care at the Christchurch Civic Creche around the time of the day-care sex-abuse hysteria. After unsuccessful appeals and serving seven years of his ten-year sentence, Ellis was released in February 2000, continuing to maintain his innocence. In 2019, he appealed to the Supreme Court to have his conviction overturned. Although he died of cancer before the appeal could be heard, the Supreme Court allowed the appeal in the interest of justice and delivered a judgment in October 2022. The Court quashed Ellis' convictions. It found there were problems with the evidence of the main prosecution witness, a psychiatrist, and the jury had not been fairly informed of the risk of contamination of the children's evidence.				
August 16, 1986	Alan Hall	Murder of Arthur Easton	Papakura, Auckland	Life imprisonment	19 years	Yes, paid $4.93 million in compensation
August 16, 1986	Alan Hall	Arthur Easton and his two sons were attacked in their home by an intruder carrying a bayonet. Easton was stabbed and bled to death. Police came across Alan Hall when door knocking in the neighbourhood two months later. He admitted owning a bayonet and a woollen beanie similar to items left at the crime scene. Hall was autistic and was subject to police interrogations without a lawyer for hours on end. When the case came to trial, the police withheld crucial evidence from the defence and falsified a written statement by one important witness. Hall was released on bail after nine years but recalled 16 years later after breaching a condition of his parole. He served another ten years. Altogether it took 36 years for his conviction to be overturned.				
August 1989	Stephen Stone, Gail Maney, Colin Maney, Mark Henriksen	Larnoch Road murders	Auckland	Varied	Varied	Yes
August 1989	Stephen Stone, Gail Maney, Colin Maney, Mark Henriksen	Deane Fuller-Sandys disappeared after leaving home to go fishing in August 1989. His body was never found, but he was later declared dead. Five days later, Leah Stephens disappeared from the same area; her body was found three years later. The prosecution alleged that Stephen Stone, a local gang member, had been paid to kill Fuller-Sandys by sex worker Gail Maney over a drug-related dispute, and that Stone had raped and murdered Stephens after discovering she planned to make a statement to the police about the Fuller-Sandys murder. Maney was convicted of conspiring to murder Fuller-Sandys, whilst Stone was convicted of murdering Fuller-Sandys and Stephens; two other men, including Maney's brother Colin, were convicted of disposing of Fuller-Sandys' body. The case came under scrutiny after two of the four alleged witnesses to the crimes recanted their testimony, claiming that the police had pressured them into lying. The other two were men who had admitted to participating in the rape of Leah Stephens and had been granted immunity in return for their testimony. Both of them had told multiple wildly varying stories about what happened and it was later proven that the police had fed them information to get their stories to match. After multiple appeals, the convictions of all four defendants were eventually quashed in 2024; during this appeal, lawyers for the crown had admitted that the case was a miscarriage of justice due to crucial evidence which had been withheld from the defence. The court outright acquitted Gail Maney, Colin Maney, and Mark Henriksen, and ordered a retrial for Stephen Stone. In April 2025 the prosecution chose not to proceed with the case against Stone and he was formally acquitted of all charges.				
March 23, 1992	Teina Pora	Rape and murder of Susan Burdett	Papatoetoe, Auckland	Life imprisonment with 10 years non-parole	21 years	Yes, paid $3.51 million in compensation
March 23, 1992	Teina Pora	Burdett was raped and murdered in her own home. Pora, who was born with fetal alcohol spectrum disorder, was arrested on other charges about a year later and during an interview was told there was a $20,000 reward for information. Pora claimed he had acted as lookout for the offender. Later, he claimed he had been present in Burdett's home. No direct evidence implicating him was presented at trial but he was convicted in 1994. Later, Malcolm Rewa was convicted on DNA evidence for a series of sex crimes, and his DNA matched that found at the Burdett scene. Pora's conviction was quashed in March 2015. He was awarded $2.52 million compensation, later inflation-adjusted to $3.51 million.				
October 1992	David Dougherty	Abduction and rape of an 11-year-old girl	Auckland	7 years 9 months' imprisonment	3 years	Yes—paid compensation
October 1992	David Dougherty	David Dougherty was convicted in 1993 on charges of abduction and the rape of an 11-year-old girl. After serving over three years in prison, he was acquitted in 1997 after new DNA evidence ruled him out. Compensation of over $800,000 was paid by the New Zealand Government and an apology given for the wrongful conviction. The real culprit, Nicholas Reekie, was later convicted of the crime.				
February 13, 1994	Rex Haig	Murder	Jackson's Bay, South Island	Life imprisonment	11 years	Yes–no compensation
February 13, 1994	Rex Haig	Mark Roderique disappeared while on a fishing trip with Rex Haig, David Hogan, and Tony Sewell aboard Haig's fishing boat, the Antares, after being involved in a fight with Haig and Hogan. Hogan and Sewell testified that Haig murdered Roderique and sank his body into Jackson's Bay. Haig's conviction was quashed in 2006 after it was discovered that Hogan had confessed to the crime. Haig was denied compensation for his imprisonment on the grounds that he had not proved he was innocent, and died in 2017 while applying to overturn the decision.				
June 20, 1994	David Bain	Murder of his parents and three siblings	Dunedin	Life imprisonment with 16 years non-parole	13 1/2 years	Conviction overturned, paid $925,000 but Govt claimed it was not compensation
June 20, 1994	David Bain	David Bain was convicted in 1995 of the murders of all five members of his family the previous year. The defence put forward the argument that David's father, Robin Bain, killed the other members of his family and then himself while David was out on his morning paper run. David spent 13 years in prison proclaiming his innocence and was supported in his pursuit of justice by former All Black Joe Karam. Bain's convictions were overturned in 2007 by the Privy Council, which found that a substantial miscarriage of justice had occurred. He was awarded a retrial in 2009 and acquitted on all charges.				
August 12, 1999	Lucy Akatere, Tania Vini & McCushla Fuataha	Aggravated robbery of a 16-year-old girl	Three Kings, Auckland	18 months, 18 months, and 24 months imprisonment (respectively)	7 months	Yes—paid compensation
August 12, 1999	Lucy Akatere, Tania Vini & McCushla Fuataha	Akatere, Vini and Fuataha were convicted in 1999 regarding the group assault and robbery of a 16-year-old girl. The Court of Appeal quashed the convictions after two key witnesses retracted their testimony. Akatere, Vini and Fuataha received between $162,000 and $177,000 each in compensation.				
September 1, 2003	Aaron Farmer	Rape of a 22-year-old woman	Sydenham, Christchurch	8 years' imprisonment	2 years	Yes—paid compensation
September 1, 2003	Aaron Farmer	Aaron Farmer was convicted in 2005 of raping a 22-year-old woman. In June 2007, the Court of Appeal set aside the conviction and ordered a retrial in June 2007 after finding that alibi evidence had not been presented to the jury. Before the retrial took place, DNA evidence excluded Farmer as the offender, and the Crown withdrew the charges. Farmer later received $351,500 compensation and a public apology from the government for the wrongful conviction.				
November 12, 2003	Phillip Johnston and Jaden Knight	Arson	Foxton, Manawatū-Whanganui	6 years' imprisonment	9 1/2 months	Yes—paid compensation
November 12, 2003	Phillip Johnston and Jaden Knight	Johnston and Knight were convicted of arson in September 2004 in relation to a fire at the Manawatu Hotel. The Court of Appeal set aside the conviction and ordered a retrial in June 2005 after it was determined the trial judge had given inadequate direction to the jury. Mr Johnston was found not guilty on retrial, while the case against Mr Knight was discharged after new evidence emerged. Johnston and Knight received $146,000 and $220,000 compensation, respectively, and a public apology from the government for the wrongful conviction.				
December 18, 2008	Mauha Fawcett	Murder of Mellory Manning	Christchurch	20 years	3 years	Yes
December 18, 2008	Mauha Fawcett	The Mongrel Mob were suspected of the abduction, rape and murder of 27-year-old Mellory Manning. Police focused on Mauha Fawcett, a developmentally disabled initiate in the gang, and interrogated him for several hours on end, during which time they implied he would be killed by the Mob unless he told them what they wanted to know. Fawcett eventually confessed to participating in the murder after police offered him $50,000 for information. None of the physical evidence matched Fawcett, whose confession changed multiple times before he eventually withdrew it. He was sentenced to 20 years' imprisonment for Manning's murder in 2014. The Court of Appeal granted Fawcett a new trial in 2017, ruling that his confession was potentially unreliable, and a judge dismissed the case in 2021.				
May 2011	David Lyttle	Murder	Whanganui, North Island	Life imprisonment	2 years	Yes
May 2011	David Lyttle	Lyttle was the prime suspect in the murder of his friend Brett Hall, who disappeared in May 2011. Unable to prove his guilt, police entrapped him using a so-called Mr. Big operation in which undercover officers persuaded him to join a fictional crime gang and then enticed him into confessing to Hall's murder with an offer of full-time membership. Lyttle's confession was contradicted by CCTV, witness statements, and mobile data, several aspects of it were said to be completely impossible, and Hall's remains were not found at the location where Lyttle admitted to burying them. Lyttle spent two years in prison after his conviction in 2019 before his conviction was quashed on appeal in 2021. It was found that the police had withheld evidence that Hall was killed by local drug dealers, and that Lyttle's confession was made under duress.				
March 13, 2013	Mr "A"	Driving while disqualified	not disclosed	14 months imprisonment	7 months	Yes—paid compensation
March 13, 2013	Mr "A"	"A" was convicted of two counts of driving while disqualified after being stopped by police. He was sentenced to 14 months’ imprisonment, of which he served seven months. He had previously been convicted of failing to stop for police in December 2007 and was disqualified from driving for six months. However, a data entry error by court staff resulted in a six-year disqualification being recorded and subsequently replicated across Police and NZTA systems. As a result, "A" was not disqualified from driving at the time of the offence. The error was identified by police in 2016, and a rehearing resulted in the convictions being quashed and the charges withdrawn. In September 2022, "A" received $108,000 in compensation for wrongful conviction and imprisonment.				

=== Nicaragua ===
Date of crime	Defendant(s)	Crime	Location	Sentence	Time served	Legally exonerated
November 21, 2006	Eric Volz	Murder of Doris Ivania Jiménez	San Juan del Sur, Nicaragua	30 years in prison	1 year, 1 month	Yes
November 21, 2006	Eric Volz	In 2004, Eric Volz moved to Nicaragua and launched El Puente (EP) Magazine, a bilingual publication focusing on conscious living and smart tourism. In November 2006, while living in Nicaragua, Volz was falsely accused and wrongfully imprisoned for the murder of his former girlfriend, Doris Jiménez, and sentenced to 30 years in prison. After a tireless campaign by his family and friends, and intervention from the highest levels of the U.S. government and other international figures, an appeals court overturned his conviction and Volz was released in December 2007. After returning to the U.S., St. Martin's Press published Volz's memoir, Gringo Nightmare: A Young American Framed for Murder in Nicaragua.				

=== Norway ===
Date of crime	Defendant(s)	Crime	Location	Sentence	Time served	Legally exonerated
September, 1976 – October 4, 1977	Fritz Moen	The rapes and murders of two women, Torunn Finstad and Sigrid Heggheim	Trondheim	21 years total in prison (was originally sentenced in the Finstad case to 25 years on May 29, 1978, but on appeal, the sentence was reversed to 16 years)	19 years	Yes (Posthumously exonerated on August 24, 2006, for the rape and murder of Torunn Finstad)
September, 1976 – October 4, 1977	Fritz Moen	Fritz Moen, wrongfully convicted for separate murders of two 20-year-old women in 1976 and 1977. He was cleared of one murder in 2004. After his death in March 2005, he was cleared of the second murder, based on a reinvestigation of the case by Norway's Criminal Case Review Commission. The case against Fritz Moen then stood as Europe's only known case of dual miscarriage, in which a country's judicial authorities have convicted the wrong person in two separately related murders.				
December 24, 1969	Per Kristian Liland	Murder of John Oval Larsen and Håkon Edvard Johansen	Fredrikstad	13 years. His sentence was extended by 10 years because he was considered a danger to society	23 years	Yes
December 24, 1969	Per Kristian Liland	Per Kristian Liland, wrongfully convicted of murdering two of his friends in 1969. He was cleared in 1994. His case is known as The Liland Affair. Liland received 13.7 million Norwegian kroner (about US$1.7 million) as compensation for the wrongful prison sentence.				
May 19, 2000	Viggo Kristiansen	The rape and murder of 10-year-old Lena Sløgedal Paulsen and 8-year-old Stine Sofie Austegard Sørstrønen	Kristiansand	21 years "forvaring" (practically speaking: life sentence with possibility for parole after 21 years)	21 years	Yes, December 15, 2022
May 19, 2000	Viggo Kristiansen	Viggo Kristiansen, wrongfully convicted of having together with Jan Helge Andersen raped and murdered two girls, 8 and 10 years old. Kristiansen received 55 million Norwegian kroner (about US$5.0 million) as compensation for the wrongful prison sentence.				
May 6, 1995	Birgitte Tengs' cousin (name not published due to being under age at the time of the killing)	The killing of his cousin Birgitte Tengs	Kopervik	14 years and to pay NOK 100.000 to Birgitte Tengs' parents	495 days	Found not guilty upon appeal in June, 1998, but still sentenced to pay the NOK 100.000 as the likely (but not beyond a reasonable doubt) killer. In February 2023 Johny Vassbakk was found guilty of the murder, and in December the same year, not guilty upon appeal.
May 6, 1995	Birgitte Tengs' cousin (name not published due to being under age at the time of the killing)	Birgitte Tengs' cousin, wrongfully convicted of having killed her.				

=== Poland ===
Date of crime	Defendant(s)	Crime	Location	Sentence	Time served	Legally exonerated
December 31, 1996	Tomasz Komenda	Rape and murder of 15-year-old Małgorzata Kwiatkowska	Miłoszyce, Poland	25 years	18 years	Yes (May 16, 2018)

=== Qatar ===
Date of crime	Defendant(s)	Crime	Location	Sentence	Time served	Legally exonerated
January 2013	Matthew and Grace Huang	Child endangerment resulting in death*	Doha	Three years	Eight months	Yes
January 2013	Matthew and Grace Huang	Matthew and Grace Huang, an American couple living in Qatar, were arrested in January 2013 after their adopted daughter Gloria died suddenly. An autopsy found that she had died from malnutrition, which led authorities to believe that her parents had starved her to death, possibly as part of an organ trafficking scheme. The Huangs were ultimately acquitted of murder and human trafficking, but in February 2014 were found guilty of child endangerment resulting in death and sentenced to three years in prison. In November that same year the case was thrown out on appeal and the Huangs were released and allowed to return to the United States.				

=== Romania ===
Date of crime	Defendant(s)	Crime	Location	Sentence	Time served	Legally exonerated
April – August 1944	Gheron Netta	Crimes against peace	Bucharest	10 years	7 years, died in prison	Yes, posthumously
April – August 1944	Gheron Netta	Minister of Finance in the Antonescu regime during its final months. Following the 1944 Romanian coup d'état which removed Antonescu from power, Netta was convicted of crimes against peace for taking part in government meetings where decisions were made to declare and continue waging war against the Soviet Union. In January 2000, 45 years after his death, the Romanian Supreme Court overturned Netta's conviction and rehabilitated him, finding that although he had attended the meetings in question he played no part in discussions relating to the war.				
July 6, 1977	Gheorghe Samoilescu	Rape, murder, desecration and burglary of 18-year old Anca Broscățeanu	Bucharest	25 years	4 years	Yes (1984)
July 6, 1977	Gheorghe Samoilescu	On 6 July 1977, 18-year-old student Anca Broscățeanu disappeared after going out to check the distribution lists for candidates at an exam at Bucharest's Academy of Economic Sciences, only for her body parts to be found scattered across Bucharest just two days later. The investigation team, composed by the Police and State Security, arrested Samoilescu after his number was found in the victim's diary. He initially pleaded innocent but after 6 months of torture he pleaded guilty for her murder, and in February 1979 was sentenced to 25 years of jail. The real killer was only discovered in November 1980 and executed in 1981. Samoilescu died in 2005 from lung cancer.				
June 16, 1992	Marcel Țundrea	Murder and rape of 13-year old Mioara Gherasie	Pojogeni, Gorj	25 years	12 years	Yes (2009)
June 16, 1992	Marcel Țundrea	On 18 June 1992, the body of Mioara Gherasie was found suffocated and raped in the village of Pojogeni, where she lived. Police then pinned the blame on Marcel Țundrea, a former railway worker who lived in Târgu Jiu. The evidence brought against him were scars on his penis, the fact that he shared the same blood group with the victim, pornographic magazines found at his home, a false testimony from a relative of the victim, and a suppressed alibi in which he was seen leaving back by train from Pojogeni to Târgu Jiu. Țundrea continued to maintain that he was innocent until he died in 2007; he had been released in 2004 following evidence showing that he was not the murderer. Țundrea was acquitted posthumously in 2009. George Avram, a man who was already jailed for murdering someone else in 1995 was accused of murdering Mioara Gherasie and received a 25-year prison sentence.				

=== Russia ===
Date of crime	Defendant(s)	Crime	Location	Sentence	Time served	Legally exonerated
1942–1945	Erich Hartmann	War crimes*	Rostov Oblast	25 years	6 years	Yes, posthumously
1942–1945	Erich Hartmann	A German fighter ace who was convicted after World War II of having attacked and killed Soviet civilians and destroyed "expensive" equipment. There is no evidence that the atrocities he was accused of took place, and historians believe that the charges were brought as retaliation for Hartmann's refusal to cooperate with his captors. In 1955 he was repatriated to West Germany, and in 1997 the Russian government rehabilitated Hartmann and declared he had been wrongly convicted.				
22 December 1978	Aleksandr Kravchenko	Rape and murder	Shakhty, Rostov Oblast	Death	Executed	Yes, posthumously
22 December 1978	Aleksandr Kravchenko	Kravchenko was the prime suspect in the rape and murder of 9-year-old Yelena Zakotnova due to having previously served a prison sentence for a similar crime. Blood spots were found on clothing in his house, which were consistent with either Zakotnova or Kravchenko's wife, and witnesses who supported Kravchenko's alibi changed their story after being pressured by the police. Kravchenko was executed by firing squad in 1983. It was later discovered that Zakotnova was the first victim of serial killer Andrei Chikatilo and Kravchenko was posthumously pardoned in 1993.				
26 August 2006	Sergey Khitrik and Vyacheslav Belevich	Rape and murder, attempted murder	Domodedovsky District, Moscow Oblast	15 years imprisonment (both)	5 years	Yes
26 August 2006	Sergey Khitrik and Vyacheslav Belevich	Khitrik and Belevich, both Belarusian migrant workers, were falsely accused of raping and killing a woman named Galina Goshovskaya, and attempting to kill her husband, Viktor Sharovarov. The accusation came from their colleague, Vasily Khiletsky, the true perpetrator who decided to put the blame on them because he disliked them. The two men were tortured by Russian police officers, with Khitrik relenting and signing a false confession to the crime, which was then used to prosecute both him and Belevich. Both men were sentenced to 15 years imprisonment, but were acquitted and released five years later, after Khiletsky was arrested for an unrelated double murder and linked to the crime. They returned to Belarus, and were awarded 2 million rubles each as compensation.				
2012–2015	Ildar Dadin	Public order offences*	Moscow	3 years	15 months	Yes
2012–2015	Ildar Dadin	Dadin was the first person to be prosecuted under Article 212.1 of the Criminal Code which declared it an imprisonable offence to repeatedly take part in anti-government protests, having peacefully protested against the government's human rights breaches on five occasions since 2015. He was widely considered a political prisoner by human rights activists. During his imprisonment, Dadin was tortured and threatened with sexual violence by prison guards. Multiple courts ruled that Article 212.1 had been applied incorrectly in Dadin's case and should only be used to target dangerous or violent demonstrations.				

=== Singapore ===
Date of crime	Defendant(s)	Crime	Location	Sentence	Time served	Legally exonerated
6 May 2005	Ismil bin Kadar	Murder of Tham Weng Kuen	Boon Lay	Death	Two years	Yes
6 May 2005	Ismil bin Kadar	69-year-old Tham Weng Kuen was stabbed to death during an assault in her flat. DNA evidence linked Muhammad bin Kadar to the crime; during his interrogation, he claimed that he had committed the crime with his older brother Ismil. During the brothers' trial, Muhammad recanted his statement, which was the only evidence against Ismil, and Tham's husband testified that Muhammad had entered the flat alone. Both brothers were sentenced to death; however, two years later the Court of Appeal of Singapore acquitted Ismil, finding that the evidence proved Muhammad had acted alone. The court upheld Muhammad's conviction and he was hanged in 2015.				

=== South Africa ===
Date of crime	Defendant(s)	Crime	Location	Sentence	Time served	Legally exonerated
2002	Thembekile Molaudzi	Robbery and murder	Pretoria, South Africa	Life on four counts	11 years	Yes
2002	Thembekile Molaudzi	In 2002, Dingaan Makuna, a policeman, was killed during a failed hijacking. The police arrested several men, including Molaudzi, a Pretoria taxi driver. One of the co-defendants, (described later in court as a "reckless liar") said Molaudzi was one of the perpetrators although he later withdrew this confession. In spite of no other evidence linking him to the crime and the fact that Makuna's daughter who had witnessed the crime did not identify Moladuzi, he was convicted and sentenced to life in jail. Moladuzi spent his time in jail trying to prove his innocence (many of the court and police documents had mysteriously disappeared), was physically abused by the warders and spent four years in solitary confinement. In 2013 the Constitutional Court overturned his conviction.				
2011	Nolubabalo Nomsuka	Murder*	Lamontville	20 years	Five years and six months	Yes
2011	Nolubabalo Nomsuka	Nolubabalo Nomsuka was wrongly convicted of the murder of her newborn son in 2011. The magistrate presiding over her trial ignored scientific evidence which showed her son had died naturally and relied on the testimony of witnesses who had only arrived when the child was already dead. Nomsuka also claimed to have been tortured by the police after refusing to confess. She was acquitted by the High Court of South Africa in 2017.				

=== South Korea ===
Date of crime	Defendant(s)	Crime	Location	Sentence	Time served	Legally exonerated
1972	Jeong Won-seop	Rape and murder	Chuncheon	Life imprisonment	15 years	Yes
1972	Jeong Won-seop	In 1972, a nine-year-old girl who was the daughter of a police chief was raped and murdered after leaving her home to visit a comic book shop. Jeong Won-seop, the owner of the comic book shop she had intended to visit, was arrested for her rape and murder. He was convicted on the basis of a confession later found to have been extracted through torture and sentenced to life imprisonment by the Chuncheon District Court, and released on parole in 1987 after serving 15 years. He was granted a retrial and acquitted by the Chuncheon District Court in 2008.				
1988	Yoon Sung-yeo	Rape and murder	Hwaseong	Life in prison	19 years	Yes
1988	Yoon Sung-yeo	Yoon Sung-yeo confessed to the murder of Park Sang-hee, initially attributed to the then-unidentified Hwaseong serial killer, and sentenced to life imprisonment. He later recanted his confession and claimed it was made under torture, but an appeal was denied and he served 19 years before being paroled in 2009. In 2019, Lee Choon-jae was identified as the Hwaseong serial killer and confessed to Park's murder. Yoon was granted a retrial and acquitted in December 2020.				

=== Spain ===
Date of crime	Defendant(s)	Crime	Location	Sentence	Time served	Legally exonerated
November 16, 1491	Alonso, Lope, García, Juan and Yosef Franco; Benito García, Moshe Abenamías	Murder of the Holy Child of La Guardia*	La Guardia, Toledo	Death	Variable	No
November 16, 1491	Alonso, Lope, García, Juan and Yosef Franco; Benito García, Moshe Abenamías	Six conversos and two Jews were arrested by the Spanish Inquisition and confessed under torture to have murdered a Christian child in La Guardia as part of a magic ritual; at least five were burned at an auto de fe in Avila. Because of constant contradictions and legal irregularities, the fact that the child was never named, no body was found, no child disappearance or murder was reported in La Guardia around that time, and obvious similarities with other European blood libels and antisemitic legends, historians agree that neither crime nor child actually existed. It is believed that the process was a sham to incite the expulsion of all Jews from Spain, which was decreed four months later.				
May 25, 1918	Gregorio Valero, León Sánchez	Murder of José María Grimaldos* (a.k.a. "the Crime of Cuenca")*	Osa de la Vega, Cuenca	18 years in prison (each)	12 years and 2 months	Yes
May 25, 1918	Gregorio Valero, León Sánchez	Grimaldos, a shepherd, disappeared after an animal sale in 1910. His family accused Valero and Sánchez of killing him and stealing the money because they had a history of bullying Grimaldos. The case was dismissed by the local examining magistrate due to lack of evidence but it was reopened by his successor, Emilio Isasa Echenique, in 1913. Under Isasa's watch, Valero and Sánchez were arrested and extrajudicially tortured to make them confess. No body was found and the accused ended up claiming that they had fed it to pigs, then burned and grinded all remains left. After Grimaldos was found alive in Mira in 1926, the Supreme Court overturned the sentence and started proceedings against those responsible for the 1913 investigation. Isasa could not be judged because of his sudden death, officially attributed to a heart attack but suspected of being a suicide.				
October 9, 1999	Dolores Vázquez	Murder of Rocío Wanninkhof	Mijas, Málaga	15 years in prison	17 months	Yes
October 9, 1999	Dolores Vázquez	Vázquez, the estranged lover of Wanninkhof's mother, was accused by her of the murder, and subsequently convicted in a jury trial despite the lack of evidence tying her to the crime. After three months, the High Court of Andalusia overturned the sentence citing gross irregularities and ordered a retrial. All charges against Vázquez were dropped when DNA found near the body was matched to Tony Alexander King, a convicted sexual offender and the murderer of another teenage girl in Coín.				
November, 1991	Ahmed Tommouhi, Abderrazak Mounib	Wave of rapes and robberies with intimidation	Barcelona, Tarragona	165 and 152 years in prison	14 years and 10 months, 9 years till death in prison	Yes
November, 1991	Ahmed Tommouhi, Abderrazak Mounib	Arrested for their resemblance to a pair of rapists. The National Court did not take into account a DNA report that exonerated them because the experts did not attend the hearing. After the error was discovered, the remaining sentences were upheld for 10 years. Mounib died in prison in 2000, while Tommohi had his convictions overturned by the Supreme Court in 2023.				
August, 1993	Romano van der Dussen	rape and robbery attacks	Fuengirola	15 years and 6 months	11 years	Yes
August, 1993	Romano van der Dussen	After three attacks in one night, a victim recognized his photo. In the lineup, he was presented alongside Spaniards. DNA proved his innocence; it belonged to the rapist and murderer Mark Dixie, but it took seven years to overturn the convictions.				

=== Sweden ===
Date of crime	Defendant(s)	Crime	Location	Sentence	Time served	Legally exonerated
1976–1988	Sture Bergwall	Confessed to murdering 30 men, but was convicted of 8 murders	Sweden, Denmark, Norway, and Finland	Closed psychiatric confinement	22–23 years	Yes
1976–1988	Sture Bergwall	The case of Thomas Quick, a.k.a. Sture Bergwall, who was convicted, and later cleared, of eight separate murders in Sweden and Norway, that he had confessed while being under psychiatric evaluation, stands as one of the most infamous cases in Swedish history.				
1998	Two underaged brothers	Murder	Arvika, Sweden			Yes
1998	Two underaged brothers	Two brothers, aged 5 and 7 at the time, were falsely accused of having caused the death of Kevin Hjalmarsson. Although the brothers were too young to stand trial, the police held a press conference stating the brothers had confessed to the murder, before closing the case. Following a television documentary in 2017, the case was reopened, and in 2018 the brothers were cleared of all wrongdoing.				
2004	Kaj Linna	Murder and robbery	Kalamark	Life imprisonment	13 years	Yes
2004	Kaj Linna	Linna was convicted on the key evidence of "Nils" who claimed he had he had heard Linna planning the robbery. Later interviews with Nils cast doubt on his veracity and Linna's conviction was overturned.				

=== Switzerland ===
Date of crime	Defendant(s)	Crime	Location	Sentence	Time served	Legally exonerated
May 1980	Werner Ferrari	Murder	Würenlos, Switzerland	Life imprisonment	Still in prison for other murders	Yes
May 1980	Werner Ferrari	In the 1980s, a string of eleven child abductions shocked Switzerland. While eight of them were found dead, the whereabouts of the others is still unknown. Werner Ferrari, who had already killed a child in 1971 and had served 8 years of a 10-year sentence for that crime, was arrested and confessed to four of the murders in 1989, but vehemently denied having murdered Ruth Steinmann in 1980. He pled guilty to the four murders he confessed to, and was convicted of murdering Steinmann. In 1995, he was sentenced to life imprisonment. Seven years later, journalist and author Peter Holenstein showed evidence that Ferrari could not have killed Steinmann, including DNA analysis that a pubic hair found on her body did not match him. A subsequent comparison of dentures proved that the bite mark on her body did not come from him, but from a similar-looking man who had committed suicide in 1983. He was acquitted of Steinmann's murder in 2007. Due to the other murders, he remains in prison, serving a life sentence.				

=== Taiwan ===
Date of crime	Defendant(s)	Crime	Location	Sentence	Time served	Legally exonerated
1996	Chiang Kuo-ching	Rape and murder of a five-year-old girl	Taipei, Taiwan	Death	Executed	Yes, posthumously
1996	Chiang Kuo-ching	Chiang was a Taiwanese air force private who was tortured for 37 hours to extract a confession, was convicted and executed by a military tribunal in 1997 for the rape and murder of a five-year-old girl. In 2011, another airman, Xu Rongzhou, who had a history of sexual abuse, confessed that he had been responsible for the crime and was convicted of it. In 2011 Chiang was posthumously acquitted by a military court. Ma Ying-jeou, Taiwan's president, apologised to Chiang's family who were awarded US$3.4 million in compensation.				
2000	Lu Chieh-min	Murder of his girl friend Kuo	Taipei	In 2010, sentenced to 13 years	Four years	Yes
2000	Lu Chieh-min	Kuo was found dead in 2000 in a public park in Taipei's Neihu District and Lu was charged. Prosecutors claimed bite marks on Kuo's neck conformed to Lu's teeth. Lu was found not guilty in two trials but found guilty at a third trial in 2010. In 2015 the Taiwanese prosecutor presented new evidence to a retrial showing DNA tests on the saliva and semen on the girl's clothes and body did not match Lu and he was found not guilty. Prosecutors said they would not appeal.				

=== Uganda ===
Date of crime	Defendant(s)	Crime	Location	Sentence	Time served	Legally exonerated
1981	Edward Edmary Mpagi	Murder of William George Wandyaka*	Kyamabaale, Masaka, Uganda	Death	18 years on death row, 2 years on remand	Presidential pardon
1981	Edward Edmary Mpagi	Mpagi was arrested in 1981 for the murder of Wandyaka. Although Wandyaka was alive and well and in hiding Mpagi was convicted on the basis of four perjured witnesses and sentenced to death. An Italian priest visited the village and found Wandayaka alive. The priest got 90 villagers to write to the attorney general testifying Wandayka was alive and Mpagi received a presidential pardon.				

=== United Kingdom ===
Date of crime	Defendant(s)	Crime	Location	Sentence	Time served	Legally exonerated
1255	71 Jews	Murder of Hugh of Lincoln	Lincoln, England	Death	Unknown	No
1255	71 Jews	Hugh was a nine-year-old boy whose body was recovered from a well belonging to a Jewish man named Copin. (Note: Copin was not one of the 71 convicted, having never been formally charged.) Copin gave a false confession which implicated other Jews in Hugh's murder after being promised immunity. King Henry III ordered that 91 local Jews be tried for the murder. Several were executed for refusal to plead (Copin was also executed on Henry's orders), two were released and the remaining 71 were found guilty of the murder. They were condemned to death but released when the king's brother Richard interceded on their behalf.				
1660	John, Richard and Joan Perry	Murder and robbery of William Harrison*	Chipping Campden, England	Death	Executed	No
1660	John, Richard and Joan Perry	Wealthy 70-year-old Harrison was last seen walking to Charingworth. After his hat, coat and neckband were found on the side of the road with a sharp cut and sprinkled in blood, his servant John Perry claimed that Perry's own brother and mother had murdered Harrison to rob him, and subsequently dumped the body in a pond. The pond was drained but no body was found. The Perrys then alternated between pleading guilt and innocence, until they were all found guilty and hanged. However, Harrison reappeared in 1662, claiming to have been abducted by Barbary pirates. It has been claimed that this case caused British courts to not give murder sentences without a body for the next 250 years.				
1678	Thomas Whitbread, John Fenwick, William Howard and others	Treason – conspiracy to murder King Charles II*	London	Execution	Executed	No
1678	Thomas Whitbread, John Fenwick, William Howard and others	Convicted and executed on the perjured evidence of Titus Oates, who was eventually found guilty of perjuring himself in two of the cases. It is believed that the king knew they were innocent but could not pardon them for fear of enraging the public.				
1679	Robert Green, Henry Berry and Lawrence Hill	Murder	London	Death	Executed	No
1679	Robert Green, Henry Berry and Lawrence Hill	Robert Green, Henry Berry and Lawrence Hill were hanged in 1679 at Greenberry Hill on false evidence for the unsolved murder of Edmund Berry Godfrey. Historians accept they were innocent.				
1705	Thomas Green, Madder, and Simpson, and a ship's crew	Murder and Piracy	Edinburgh	Death	Executed	Partial
1705	Thomas Green, Madder, and Simpson, and a ship's crew	The 21-year-old Captain Green of the Worcester, an English East Indiaman, his first mate, and a gunner were executed, after their crew, ship and cargo were seized and sold, on being forced into the River Forth by weather. The whole ship's crew had been detained, and charged on an invented Murder and Piracy charges, in retaliation for a Scotch East Indiaman Annandale being seized in the Thames.				
1835	James Pratt and John Smith	Sodomy	London	Death	Executed	
1835	James Pratt and John Smith	James Pratt and John Smith were two London men who, in November 1835, became the last two to be executed for sodomy in England. Modern interpretation cast doubt on the facts and legality of the conviction. In January 2017, Pratt and Smith were among those who were posthumously pardoned by the Alan Turing law which pardoned those who had been convicted of criminalised homosexuality offences which no longer exist in the UK.				
1844	Samuel Chambers	Criminal damage in a coal mine	Lount, Leicestershire	Transportation (7 years)	1 – 2 years	Yes
1844	Samuel Chambers	Samuel Chambers was convicted at the Leicestershire Midsummer Sessions of maliciously flooding Smoile colliery on 22 May 1844. Within 10 days grave doubts over the conviction were reported. Yet on 10 August, Chambers began a three-month voyage in the convict ship William Jardine to Van Diemen's Land. Not until 13 July 1845 did the Secretary of State recommend a Free Pardon, together with a free passage home. The Colony was aware of Chambers' Free Pardon by June 1846, and although Chambers returned to his family in Awsworth, England, when and how he returned is unknown.				
1859	Henry John Hatch	Indecent assault*	Wandsworth	4 years	191 days	Yes
1859	Henry John Hatch	Hatch was accused of sexually abusing two young girls who had been under his tuition. He was found guilty in spite of numerous contradictions in the testimony of the alleged victims. Hatch was sentenced to four year's hard labour, but received a Royal Pardon less than a year into his sentence after one of his accusers was found guilty of lying under oath during his trial. It was widely suspected that the girls' parents had coached them to lie, but this was never proved.				
1867	Thomas Maguire	Murder of Charles Brett	Manchester	Death	1 month	Yes
1867	Thomas Maguire	Maguire was mistakenly identified as one of a party of Irish republicans who ambushed a prison van carrying two republican leaders and killed a police sergeant when he refused to unlock the doors (the Manchester Martyrs incident). According to Liz Curtis, witnesses "blatantly perjured themselves" to convict Maguire. He received a pardon after widespread public pressure.				
1876	William Habron	Murder	London	Life imprisonment	3 years	Yes
1876	William Habron	Convicted of the fatal shooting of Constable Nicholas Cock during a burglary. The jury at his trial recommended mercy and so he avoided the death penalty, which was usually mandatory for murder. Another man, Charles Peace, eventually confessed to the crime to exonerate Habron, who was pardoned and awarded compensation.				
1895	Adolf Beck	Fraud	London	7 years in prison	6 years	Yes
1895	Adolf Beck	Wrongfully convicted on the basis of mistaken eyewitness testimony, unreliable methods of conviction and a rush to convict by the police. His case led to the creation of the English Court of Criminal Appeal.				
1908	Oscar Slater	Murder	Glasgow	Death	19 years	Yes
1908	Oscar Slater	Oscar Slater was wrongfully convicted in 1909 of the murder of Marion Gilchrist on the flimsiest evidence, and sentenced to death. His sentence was commuted to life imprisonment, and he served at hard labour until his conviction was quashed in 1928.				
1931	William Herbert Wallace	Murder	Liverpool	Death		Yes
1931	William Herbert Wallace	William Herbert Wallace was convicted of murdering his wife, but the conviction was overturned by the Court of Criminal Appeal in 1931, the first such instance of a capital conviction being quashed.				
1949	Timothy Evans	Murder	London	Death	Executed	Partial
1949	Timothy Evans	Evans's wife and young daughter were found strangled in 1949. Evans initially made a statement confessing to the murders while in police custody, but later withdrew it, citing the shock of discovering that his daughter had been killed and his fear of police as reasons for his false confession. In 1950, Evans was convicted and hanged for the murder of his daughter, largely on the basis of his original confession. His conviction was also assisted by evidence provided by his neighbour, John Christie, whom Evans had accused of being the murderer after withdrawing his own confession. Christie was later found to be a serial killer who had murdered at least six women at the same property where Evans's wife and daughter had been killed. An official inquiry conducted 15 years after Evans's hanging concluded that Christie had been responsible for the death of Evans's daughter, allowing the Home Secretary, Roy Jenkins, to apply for a royal pardon of Evans's conviction in October 1966. The case was important in leading to the abolition of capital punishment in the UK in 1965. On 19 November 2004, the Court of Appeal said that the cost and resources of quashing the conviction could not be justified, although the judges did accept that Evans had not murdered either his wife or his child.				
1949	George Kelly	Double murder	Liverpool	Death	Executed	Yes, posthumously
1949	George Kelly	George Kelly was executed in 1950 for the 1949 murder of the manager (and his assistant) of the Cameo Cinema in Liverpool, during a robbery gone wrong. The case became known as the Cameo murder. Kelly's conviction was overturned in 2003. Another man, Donald Johnson, had confessed to the crime but the police bungled Johnson's case and had not divulged his confession at Kelly's trial.				
1952	Mahmood Hussein Mattan	Murder of a woman	Cardiff	Death	Executed	Yes, posthumously
1952	Mahmood Hussein Mattan	Mahmood Mattan, a Somali fisherman, was arrested and convicted of the murder of 42-year-old Lily Volpert, despite the police bungling the investigation. Mattan was hanged in Cardiff in 1952. His conviction was overturned in 1998. £1.4 million compensation was shared out between Mattan's widow Laura, and her three children.				
1952	Derek Bentley	Murder of a policeman	Croydon	Death	Executed	Yes, posthumously
1952	Derek Bentley	Bentley, a mentally handicapped young man, and his accomplice Christopher Craig, attempted a burglary. The police found them and a policeman was killed by a shot from Craig's revolver. Craig was under 18 and could not be executed; however, Bentley was executed. In 1998, the Court of Appeal quashed Bentley's conviction for murder.				
1969	Rolf Harris	Indecent assault*	Portsmouth	Five years	Three years	Partial, (Note: Harris was convicted of twelve charges of indecent assault; one of these convictions was later quashed, but the other eleven were upheld, with the court of appeal stating they were satisfied that the other eleven convictions were safe.) 2017 (no compensation)
1969	Rolf Harris	Harris was convicted of twelve counts of sexual offences against children in 2014 as a result of Operation Yewtree. One of the charges alleged that he had indecently assaulted an eight-year-old girl during a visit to a community centre in Portsmouth in 1969, although no record of this visit could be found. Harris served three years of a five-year prison sentence before being released; after his release, the conviction for the 1969 assault was quashed by the court of appeal after the sole witness placing him at the community centre on the day was proven to be a fantasist. Harris also appealed his other eleven convictions, but the court upheld them, finding that there was no reason to doubt his convictions.				
1972	Andrew Evans	Murder of a girl	Tamworth	Life	25 years	Yes (Note: Although the Court of Appeal quashed his conviction, it explicitly outlined that it was not declaring him innocent, stating "If, to allow the appeal, we were required to be satisfied of the appellant's innocence, we would not be so satisfied."), 1997 (compensation granted)
1972	Andrew Evans	Andrew Evans confessed to the 1972 murder of 14-year-old Judith Roberts after seeing the girl's face in a dream. He was convicted and served more than 25 years. His conviction was overturned in 1997. The Court of Appeal clarified in its judgement that it was not declaring him innocent.				
1972	Liam Holden	Murder	Belfast	Death, commuted to life imprisonment	17 years	Yes, 2012
1972	Liam Holden	Liam Holden was convicted of murdering a British soldier in Northern Ireland in 1973 during The Troubles. Holden later claimed to have been forced to sign a confession by soldiers who tortured and threatened to shoot him. He became the last person ever sentenced to death by a British court (while the death penalty had been abolished in Great Britain in 1965, it was retained in Northern Ireland until July 1973). After the death penalty was abolished in Northern Ireland, Holden's death sentence was commuted to life imprisonment. He was released on license in 1989. In 2012, an appeals court overturned his conviction.				
1972	Stockwell Six	Robbery, assault*	Stockwell, London	Varied	Varied	Yes, 2021 and 2025
1972	Stockwell Six	Six black men arrested at Stockwell tube station by a group of white undercover police officers led by Derek Ridgewell, who falsely claimed that the six had attempted to rob them at knifepoint and then violently resisted arrest. Five - Ronald De Souza, Paul Green, Courtney Harriot, Cleveland Davison and Texo Johnson - were found guilty of various charges, while the sixth was acquitted. Ridgewell was later proved during Stephen Simmons's appeal in 2018 to have fabricated evidence in a number of cases, which led to Harriot, Green, and Davison appealing their convictions and being cleared in 2021. Texo Johnson was also cleared later that year, and De Souza's conviction was overturned in 2025.				
1972	Oval Four	Robbery, resisting arrest*	Oval, London	2 years, reduced to 8 months	8 months	Yes, 2019
1972	Oval Four	The Oval Four—Winston Trew, Sterling Christie, George Griffiths and Constantine Boucher—were arrested by undercover police led by DS Derek Ridgewell at Oval tube station in March 1972. They later claimed to have been beaten up in custody, but were tried and found guilty. Subsequently, a number of Ridgewell's cases were discovered to be unsound and overturned, while Ridgewell himself eventually died in prison having been convicted of stealing mail bags. In 2019 the four men's case was returned to the Appeal Court, who overturned their convictions after 47 years.				
1972	Colin Lattimore, Ronnie Leighton, Ahmet Salih	Murder of Maxwell Confait	Catford, London	Varied	Three years	Yes, 1975 (no compensation)
1972	Colin Lattimore, Ronnie Leighton, Ahmet Salih	Three teenagers were accused of the murder of Maxwell Confait, a cross-dressing male prostitute who was found strangled to death in a burning building in April 1972. Colin Lattimore, who had severe learning disabilities, was forced to confess to being at the scene of the crime and implicated his two friends, Ronnie Leighton and Ahmet Salih. Leighton was found guilty of murder, Lattimore of manslaughter, and Salih of arson. Three years later they were cleared by the Court of Appeal after new evidence showed that they had an alibi for Confait's time of death.				
1973	Stephen Downing	Murder of Wendy Sewell	Bakewell	Life	28 years	Yes, 2002
1973	Stephen Downing	Downing, an intellectually disabled teenager, confessed to sexually assaulting and murdering Wendy Sewell after an eight-hour interrogation during which he was physically assaulted by police and did not have a lawyer present. His conviction was quashed in 2002 after the court of appeal ruled that his confession was inadmissible and that blood spatter evidence was equally consistent with Downing's claim of having found Sewell's body after she was killed. Police later tried to charge Downing again after the double jeopardy laws were changed but were unable to find enough evidence. This was the longest miscarriage of justice in British history at the time, though it was later surpassed by the case of Peter Sullivan.				
1974	Judith Ward	Planting time bomb	Yorkshire	Life	18 years	Yes, 1992 (compensation granted)
1974	Judith Ward	In November 1974 Judith Ward was wrongfully convicted of the February M62 coach bombing, which killed 12 people (9 soldiers & 3 civilians) and injuring 38. She was also convicted of a handful of smaller bombings (which resulted in no fatalities).				
1974	Birmingham Six	Planting two bombs	Birmingham	Life	17 years	Yes, 1991 (compensation granted)
1974	Birmingham Six	The Birmingham Six were convicted in 1975 of planting two bombs in pubs in Birmingham in 1974 that killed 21 people and injured 182. They were finally released in 1991.				
1974	Jessie McTavish	Murder of a patient with insulin and grievous bodily harm	Glasgow	Life imprisonment	4 months	Yes, (Note: Although she was released on appeal, the judges said that there was ample evidence to support the conviction and the technicality that had led to her successful appeal was something that a "few words could have cured".) 1975 (no compensation)
1974	Jessie McTavish	Scottish nurse who was convicted in 1974 of the murder of a patient with insulin after being inspired by the plot of A Man Called Ironside. She was released on appeal in 1975, despite three appeal court judges saying there was ample evidence to support the conviction, as the trial judge had inadvertently misled the jury in his final summary. The appeal court judges said that it was an omission that "a few words could have cured". Apart from the case prosecuted, another 23 cases were deemed suspicious by investigators. Although acquitted, McTavish's case often is mentioned in lectures at medical colleges in Britain, and is cited in textbooks and academic papers about forensic science and medical malpractice. McTavish, now known as Jessie Gordon, is believed to have been the inspiration for serial killer nurse Colin Norris.				
October and November 1974 and 1975	Guildford Four and Maguire Seven	Planting bombs, making bombs	Guildford and Woolwich	Murder and other charges	Guildford Four: 15 years; Maguire Seven: 14 years, 11 years, 4 years & 3 years, respectively	Yes, 1989 & 1991 (compensation granted)
October and November 1974 and 1975	Guildford Four and Maguire Seven	The Guildford Four and Maguire Seven were wrongly convicted in 1974 and 1976, respectively, of planting bombs in various pubs in Guildford and Woolwich. Their convictions were quashed in 1989 and 1991. On February 9, 2005, British Prime Minister Tony Blair issued a public apology to the Maguire Seven and the Guildford Four for the "miscarriages of justice they had suffered".				
1974–1978	Terry Pinfold and Harry MacKenney	Contract killings	London	Life	23 years	Yes, 2003 (compensation granted)
1974–1978	Terry Pinfold and Harry MacKenney	Two Essex businessmen and former prisoners, Pinfold and MacKenney, were convicted of murder at the Old Bailey in 1980 after John Childs confessed in 1979 to six contract killings from 1974 to 1978 and implicated the pair, his former employers, in the crimes. The bodies were never found, but MacKenney received a whole life tariff. Pinfold was released on bail in 2001 and after a referral by the Criminal Cases Review Commission, both Pinfold and MacKenney had their convictions overturned at the Court of Appeal in 2003. A forensic psychiatrist, David Somekh, concluded that Childs had a personality disorder that led him to compulsively lie, and the original trial jury were blocked from being told this. Pinfold's lawyer said that former Detective Chief Inspector James Harrison-Griffiths was told in 1976 by Commander Bert Wickstead of the Metropolitan Police that the apparent first victim, Terry Eve—by then a missing person—was alive and living in west London. Lord Woolf, with Mr Justice Aikens and Mr Justice Davis, ruled that Childs' evidence against the pair was unreliable because he was a "pathological liar".				
1975	Stefan Kiszko	Rape and murder of a girl	Rishworth Moor, West Yorkshire	Life	16 years	Yes, 1992 (compensation granted)
1975	Stefan Kiszko	Stefan Kiszko was convicted in 1976 for the rape and murder of 11-year-old Lesley Molseed the previous year. He spent 16 years in prison before he was released in 1992, after a long campaign by his mother. He died of a heart attack the following year at the age of 41. His mother died a few months later. In 2007, Ronald Castree, of Shaw, near Oldham, was arrested on DNA evidence, was convicted of Molseed's murder at Bradford Crown Court and jailed for life.				
1975	Stephen Simmons, Christopher Poulter, Kevin Biggs	Theft*	Clapham, London	Eight months	Eight months	Yes, 2018
1975	Stephen Simmons, Christopher Poulter, Kevin Biggs	Simmons and two friends were convicted of stealing mailbags due to perjured testimony from corrupt police officer Derek Ridgewell. Ridgewell himself was later found guilty of the same crime in 1980. 43 years later, Simmons appealed after reading about Ridgewell's conviction on the Internet and his conviction was quashed. The appeal also led to the revelation that Ridgewell had been involved in framing numerous other people, including the Oval Four and Stockwell Six. Simmons' two co-defendants, Christopher Poulter and Kevin Biggs, had their convictions quashed in 2026, though Biggs had died in 2004.				
1976 – 1978	Bruce George Peter Lee	Manslaughter, arson	Hull	Indefinite hospital detention		Partially, (Note: Seventeen of Lee's 37 convictions were overturned on appeal. The remaining twenty counts were upheld and Lee remains detained as of 2026.) 1983 and 2022
1976 – 1978	Bruce George Peter Lee	Also known as Peter Dinsdale and Peter Tredget. He confessed to starting a series of fires in the Hull area between 1973 and 1979, resulting in 26 deaths. Lee pleaded guilty to eleven counts of arson and 26 counts of manslaughter on the grounds of diminished responsibility; however he later recanted his confessions and claimed he was completely innocent. In 1983 the Court of Appeal upheld most of his convictions, but overturned those relating to a 1977 fire in Hessle which killed eleven people, as new evidence suggested that the fire was accidental. Lee's remaining convictions were referred back to the Court of Appeal by the Criminal Cases Review Commission in 2021. In 2022 a panel of three judges overturned Lee's convictions related to fires in 1976 and 1978, holding that his physical disabilities made it impossible for him to have started the fires in the manner described in his confessions, but once again upheld the remainder of the charges. As of 2026, Lee remains imprisoned and continues to maintain his innocence.				
1977	Robert Brown	Murder of a woman	Hulme, Manchester	Life	25 years	Yes, 2002 (compensation granted)
1977	Robert Brown	Brown was convicted in 1977 of the murder of 51-year-old Annie Walsh at her flat in Hulme, Greater Manchester. Despite numerous appeals, Brown's conviction was only declared 'unsafe' in 2002, when three appeal court judges heard how his confession was beaten out of him, the forensic evidence pointed to someone else and a report into police corruption (that led to Brown's interrogating officer being jailed for four years) was suppressed until days before his 2002 appeal. Brown was eligible for parole in 1992, but he refused to admit to a crime that he did not commit and so prolonged his sentence. Brown stated that clearing his name was more important than his freedom.				
1977	Anthony Steel	Murder of a woman	Bradford	Life	20 years	Yes, 2003 (compensation granted)
1977	Anthony Steel	Steel was convicted of the murder of Carol Wilkinson, who was struck on the head and suffered a fractured skull in Bradford, West Yorkshire, on 10 October 1977. The murder was initially investigated as a possible Yorkshire Ripper attack, as the killer, whose real name was Peter Sutcliffe, was in the midst of a five-year killing spree that took place between 1975 and 1980 across Bradford, Leeds, and other nearby towns and cities. However, detectives concluded that Wilkinson's murder was not linked to Sutcliffe. Steel was convicted on the basis of a confession he made after intense questioning, during which he was told that he would be allowed to see a solicitor if he confessed. Although his confession failed to include any details of the murder, and Yorkshire Ripper detective Jim Hobson testified at trial that he did not believe the confession, Steel was narrowly convicted. The conviction was quashed in 2003 after the court heard that Steel had a learning disability and was a vulnerable interviewee. Steel received an official police apology and between £50,000 and £100,000 in compensation. His health had been severely damaged by his nineteen years’ imprisonment for a crime he did not commit, and he remained in poor health following his release from prison. He died of a heart attack on 30 September 2007, aged 52. Since his acquittal, several investigators have stated that Sutcliffe was the likely perpetrator. They have pointed out that Sutcliffe knew Wilkinson, had argued with her father over his advances towards her, and had mutilated one of his confirmed victims nearby earlier that same day. Sutcliffe did not confess to Wilkinson's murder at his trial in 1981, but by that time, Steel was already serving a prison sentence for the crime.				
1978	Paul Blackburn	Attempted murder	Chester	Life imprisonment	25 years	Yes, 2005 (compensation granted)
1978	Paul Blackburn	Paul Blackburn was convicted in 1978 when aged 15 of the attempted murder of a nine-year-old boy, and spent nearly 25 years in 18 different prisons, during which time he maintained his innocence. He said he had never considered saying he was guilty to secure an earlier release because it was a matter of "integrity". He was released on licence in March 2003. His conviction was overturned in May 2005 by the Court of Appeal, which ruled the trial had been unfair and the conviction 'unsafe': his confession, given with prompting, and later retracted, should never have been used as evidence in his trial.				
1978	Bridgewater Four	Murder of a boy	Stourbridge	Life and 12 years (Malloy)	18 years	Yes, 1997
1978	Bridgewater Four	The Bridgewater Four were convicted in 1979 of murdering Carl Bridgewater, a 13-year-old paper boy who was shot on his round when he disturbed robbers at a farm in Staffordshire. Patrick Molloy died in jail in 1981. The remaining three were released in 1997 after their convictions were overturned.				
1979	Sean Hodgson	Murder	Southampton	Life imprisonment	27 years	Yes, 2009 (compensation granted)
1979	Sean Hodgson	Sean Hodgson, also known as Robert Graham Hodgson, was convicted in 1982 of the 1979 murder of Teresa De Simone following various confessions to police, although he pleaded not guilty at his trial. His defence said he was a pathological liar and the confessions were untrue. After 27 years in jail, he was released on March 18, 2009, by the Court of Appeal as a result of advances in DNA analysis that established his innocence. Later in 2009, it was revealed that a deceased man, David Lace (who committed suicide in 1988), was the likely killer of De Simone, with the dead man's DNA matching the killer's.				
1982–1984	Danny McNamee	Conspiracy to bomb	Crossmaglen	25 years	12 years	Yes, 1998
1982–1984	Danny McNamee	McNamee, accused of being an IRA bomb-maker, was found guilty of conspiring to cause explosions between 1982 and 1984. His conviction was overturned because of other, much more prominent, fingerprints on the bomb circuit boards belonging to bombmaker Dessie Ellis, as well as experts calling into question evidence which had been presented linking him to the 1982 Hyde Park bombing.				
1984	Thomas Campbell and Joseph Steele	Arson and murder	East Glasgow	Life imprisonment	20 years	Yes, 2004 (compensation granted)
1984	Thomas Campbell and Joseph Steele	On 16 April 1984, a fire at a flat in Ruchazie, a housing estate in Glasgow, led to the deaths of 18-year old Arthur "Fat Boy" Doyle, and 4 of his family members, 2 of them being minors. Thomas "TC" Campbell and Joseph Steele were convicted, despite one of the two eyewitnesses (Joseph Granger) stating in court that his testimony was fabricated. Eight years later, the other eyewitness, William Love admitted to having lied to the trial, having been accused previously of perverting the course of justice three times. Evidence also came out that the two men had been subject to police abuse, Campbell having accused the police of "fitting him up". Steele and Campbell both staged protest actions, Steele having once glued himself to the gates of the Buckingham Palace and Campbell having gone on hunger strike. Both men first appealed their convictions in 1989 but only in 2004, the Court of Criminal Appeal in Edinburgh overturned their convictions. In 2019, Thomas Campbell died at his home.				
1985	Tottenham Three: Winston Silcott, Engin Raghip, Mark Braithwaite	Murder	London	Imprisonment	6 years	Yes, 1991 (compensation granted)
1985	Tottenham Three: Winston Silcott, Engin Raghip, Mark Braithwaite	Three men were convicted for the murder of PC Keith Blakelock during the 1985 Broadwater Farm riot in Tottenham. They were cleared in 1991, when new evidence came to light.				
1986	Michael Shirley	Rape and murder of Linda Cook	Portsmouth	Life imprisonment	16 years	Yes, 2003
1986	Michael Shirley	Michael Shirley, a Royal Navy seaman, was convicted of the rape and murder of a 24-year-old barmaid in Portsmouth, Hampshire, in 1986. After completing the recommended minimum 15 years of his life sentence he maintained his innocence even though this meant he would not be released on parole. In 2002 the case was referred by the Criminal Cases Review Commission to the Court of Appeal, where the conviction was quashed on the basis of fresh DNA evidence.				
1986	Peter Sullivan	Murder	Bebington	Life imprisonment	38 years	Yes, 2025
1986	Peter Sullivan	Sullivan, who was "highly suggestible" and had a low mental capacity, falsely confessed to the rape and murder of Diane Sindall after being held without legal representation for two days. His conviction was eventually overturned and he was released in 2025 after DNA testing on a sperm sample from the crime scene proved he was not the killer. The case is thought to be the longest miscarriage of justice in British history.				
1986	Ernest Barrie	Robbery	Blantyre, South Lanarkshire	18 years	3 years	Yes, 1989
1986	Ernest Barrie	Barrie had been convicted of robbing £40,000 from the Clydesdale Bank in Blantyre, South Lanarkshire in 1986. However, an investigation by the TV program Rough Justice showed through analysis of CCTV footage from the bank that it was "highly probable" the robber was not Barrie, who was of a different height and build to the perpetrator. An appeal court quashed Barrie's conviction in 1989.				
1987	Cardiff Newsagent Three (Michael O'Brien, Darren Hall and Ellis Sherwood)	Murder	Cardiff	Life	11 years	Yes, 1999 (granted compensation)
1987	Cardiff Newsagent Three (Michael O'Brien, Darren Hall and Ellis Sherwood)	The trio were wrongly convicted for the murder of newsagent Phillip Saunders, who was battered with a spade outside his Cardiff home. The day's takings from his kiosk had been stolen, and five days later he died of his injuries. The Court of Appeal quashed their convictions in 1999. The three have since been paid six figure compensation, but South Wales Police had still not apologised or admitted liability for malicious prosecution.				
1988	Cardiff Three (Steven Miller, Yusef Abdullahi, and Tony Paris)	Murder	Cardiff	Life imprisonment	2 years	Yes, 1992 (granted compensation)
1988	Cardiff Three (Steven Miller, Yusef Abdullahi, and Tony Paris)	The Cardiff Three were falsely jailed in 1990 for the murder of prostitute Lynette White in Cardiff in 1988 and later cleared on appeal due to DNA evidence. In 2003, Jeffrey Gafoor was jailed for life for the murder. Subsequently, in 2005, twelve police officers were arrested and questioned for false imprisonment, conspiracy to pervert the course of justice and misconduct. In 2011, eight of the officers stood trial at Swansea Crown Court for perverting the course of justice together with three witnesses accused of perjury. However, the case collapsed, as the judge ruled the officers could not be given a fair trial due to the previous publicity.				
1988	Eddie Browning	Murder	M50 motorway	Life imprisonment	5 and a half years	Yes, 1994 (awarded damages)
1988	Eddie Browning	Browing was convicted of the murder of pregnant Marie Wilks, a 22-year-old woman who had broken down on the side of the M50 motorway. Browning was arrested after his friends reported that he matched the photofit of the suspect, and it was discovered that on the day Browning had had a row with his pregnant wife and stormed off telling her he was driving to Scotland. He would have used the M50 to drive in that direction. Browning owned a silver Renault 25 car similar to one seen at the scene, and a 20-foot tyre mark near the embankment where the body was found was linked to a bald tyre on Browning's car that may have made that type of mark. He was released on appeal in 1994 after it was found that the police had failed to disclose a video of a witness under hypnosis. Reacting, the head of West Mercia Police said: "All I would say is that I was completely satisfied with the investigation". Reinvestigations have found no other evidence or suspect and Browning died aged 63 in 2018. His death was not considered suspicious.				
1988	M25 Three	Murder and robbery	London	Life	10 years	Yes, (Note: Although they were released by the Court of Appeal, the presiding judges said that they were not declaring them innocent, saying: "The case against all three appellants was formidable. The evidence against Rowe was overwhelming... For the better understanding of those who have listened to this judgment and of those who may report it hereafter this is not a finding of innocence, far from it.") 2000
1988	M25 Three	Convictions ruled unsafe after an appeal to the European Court of Justice. A large number of items stolen in the robberies had been found in the possession of the men at the time, and the girlfriend of Raphael Rowe (one of the three) handed police a number of items Rowe had given her, which were all found to have been stolen in the robberies. Prints from Rowe's shoes were also found at one of the scenes and the girlfriend testified that Rowe had left that night and only returned in the morning wearing different jeans and shoes and carrying a Sainsbury's bag – which was the same type of which had been taken in one of the robberies. Members of the gang also admitted having stolen the car that was used in the murder only days before. Although they were reluctantly released by the Court of Appeal judges, they insisted that they were not declaring the men innocent, stating: "The case against all three appellants was formidable. The evidence against Rowe was overwhelming... For the better understanding of those who have listened to this judgment and of those who may report it hereafter this is not a finding of innocence, far from it."				
1990	Lee Clegg	Murder, attempted wounding*	Belfast	Life	2 years	Yes, 2000 (no compensation)
1990	Lee Clegg	Clegg was a British Army sergeant stationed in Belfast during The Troubles. On 30 September 1990, Karen Reilly and Martin Peake were fatally shot while driving a stolen car at speed through a checkpoint guarded by Clegg and others, having ignored instructions to stop the car. Clegg was convicted of murdering Reilly and attempting to wound Peake, due to evidence that the shots that killed them had been fired after the car had passed and was no longer a threat to the soldiers. Clegg's murder conviction was overturned by an appeal court in 1999 when new evidence showed that the shot that killed Reilly had in fact been fired as the car passed through the checkpoint, meaning that the vehicle could still have been a threat at that point. A later appeal also overturned the wounding conviction when witness testimony that Clegg had shot Peake after the car had passed was discredited.				
1991	Christy Walsh	Possessing explosives	Belfast	Imprisonment	14 years	Yes, 2010 (no compensation)
1991	Christy Walsh	Conviction overturned as unsafe (procedural irregularities might have amounted to an interference with his right to a fair trial) on a third appeal. Walsh was refused compensation.				
1991	Michelle and Lisa Taylor	Murder of Alison Shaughnessy	London	Life	1 year	Yes, 1993 (no compensation)
1991	Michelle and Lisa Taylor	The sisters, aged 21 and 19 respectively, were convicted of the murder of Alison Shaughnessy by unanimous jury decision at the Old Bailey in 1992. The press and media had taken a great interest in the case as it materialised that the murder of the newly married woman in her flat occurred at the time when a love triangle had emerged involving the victim, her husband and his secret mistress Michelle. Two women were seen running from the scene, and fresh fingerprints implicated the sisters, who claimed to have never been to the flat. Evidence was also discovered that indicated Michelle wished to eliminate Shaughnessy as a rival to the love of the victim's husband, such as a diary entry that read "my dream solution would be for Alison to disappear, as if she never existed". They had their convictions overturned in controversial circumstances one year later on technical grounds and because it was judged that the sensationalist media coverage may have influenced jurors. Reinvestigations of the case did not identify any other suspects, and in 2002 it was decided to no longer formally investigate the case. Bernard O'Mahoney, a man who had originally campaigned for the release of the Taylors and who then had an affair with Michelle, has since claimed that she confessed to the murder to him and has campaigned for the sisters to be re-convicted. They were not awarded compensation, becoming the first victims of a miscarriage of justice in the UK to have been denied any.				
1992	John Corcoran	Murder of Helen Gorrie	Horndean, Hampshire	Life	3 years	Yes, 2003
1992	John Corcoran	21-year-old Corcoran was jailed for the 1992 murder of 15-year-old Helen Gorrie. She had left her house one night to meet up with Corcoran, who she had only met the night before when he was cruising around the area in his car. She was found half-naked and strangled but not sexually assaulted at a spot popular with courting couples 10 minutes from her home, and police believed Corcoran had killed her after she rebuffed his sexual advances. He could not account for his movements for 40 minutes that night, when he had left his friends saying he had to meet someone. He was released on a technicality in January 2003 and moved back to Warren Park in Havant, but police revealed that there were no grounds to re-open the murder investigation. Officially, Gorrie's murder remains unsolved.				
1993	Jonathan Jones	Murders of Harry and Megan Tooze	Llanharry	Life	1 year	Yes, 1996 (no compensation)
1993	Jonathan Jones	Jones was convicted of the shotgun murders of his girlfriend's parents, which were committed at their remote farmhouse in Llanharry on 26 July 1993. Inside the farmhouse the best china had been placed on the table, as if the couple were expecting a close guest. Jones' fingerprint was found on a teacup which was only ever used when there was an important visitor, despite him saying he had never used it. It was discovered that no witnesses supported his 'alibi' that he had spent the day visiting estate agents in Orpington, with no estate agents in the area saying they remembered seeing or speaking to him. Police also discovered that he and his girlfriend were in financial difficulty, and that Harry and Megan had a £150,000 life insurance policy that was paid to the girlfriend (the victim's daughter), indicating that this was a motive for the murders. Although the consensus was that he could not be found guilty on this evidence, the jury at his trial were convinced and found him guilty after only two hours of deliberation. He was, however, released on appeal a year later after a campaign by the girlfriend. To this day no-one has ever come forward to confirm Jones' alibi and there remains no proof of what he was doing that day. He has been denied compensation as there is no evidence that proves he was innocent, and subsequent attempts to solve the murders have failed to unearth any new suspects.				
1996	Sally Clark	Murder of her two sons*	Devizes	Life	4 years	Yes, 2003
1996	Sally Clark	Sally Clark was convicted in 1996 of the murder of her two small sons Christopher and Harry, and spent three years in jail, finally being released in 2003 on appeal. The convictions were based solely on the analysis of the deaths by the Home Office Pathologist Alan Williams, who failed to disclose relevant information about the deaths, that was backed up by the paediatric professor Sir Roy Meadow, whose opinion was pivotal in several other child death convictions, many of which have been overturned or are in the process of being disputed. In 2005 Williams was found guilty of serious professional misconduct and barred from practising pathology for three years. In July 2005 Meadow was removed from the Medical Register for serious professional misconduct and prohibited from practising medicine. Clark became an alcoholic as a result of her ordeal and died of alcohol poisoning in 2007.				
1996	Donna Anthony	Murder of two babies*	Somerset	Life	6 years	Yes, 2005
1996	Donna Anthony	Anthony was wrongly jailed in 1998 for the death of her 11-month-old son, also because of the opinion of Sir Roy Meadow, and was finally released in 2005.				
1996	Victor Nealon	Rape	Redditch	Discretionary life sentence	17 years	Yes, 2013 (no compensation)
1996	Victor Nealon	Conviction quashed after an unknown person's DNA was found on the woman's clothes. Nealon was denied compensation.				
1997	Siôn Jenkins	Murder	Hastings, East Sussex	Life imprisonment	6 years	Yes, (Note: Jenkins was never found not guilty or acquitted by the Court of Appeal, but after juries failed to reach a verdict in two retrials and the Crown Prosecution Service declined to press for a further retrial, Jenkins was declared formally acquitted in consequence) 2006 (no compensation)
1997	Siôn Jenkins	Siôn Jenkins was acquitted in February 2006 after a second retrial of the 1997 murder of his foster daughter Billie-Jo Jenkins. He was convicted in 1998 but the conviction was quashed in 2004 following a CCRC referral. The basis of the quashed conviction at the Court of Appeal (Criminal Division) were the concessions by the Crown's pathologist that evidence given at the first tribunal were inaccurate. Jenkins has been denied compensation on the grounds that there is no evidence that proves his innocence.				
1999	Angela Cannings	Murder of two babies*	Salisbury, Wiltshire	Life	2 years	Yes, 2003
1999	Angela Cannings	Angela Cannings was jailed wrongly for four years on the now discredited evidence of Sir Roy Meadow. It was determined that the two children she was accused of suffocating were victims of sudden infant death syndrome rather than murder.				
1999 to 2015	Sub-postmasters operating the Horizon computer system	Theft, false accounting and fraud*	Around the UK	Various, usually fines and imprisonment lasting up to 12 years	Varies	Yes
1999 to 2015	Sub-postmasters operating the Horizon computer system	In 1999, the UK Post Office introduced a computer accounting system named Horizon. By 2013, the system was being used by at least 11,500 branches, and was processing some six million transactions every day. From 1999 onwards unexplained discrepancies and losses began to be reported by sub-postmasters. The Post Office maintained that Horizon was "robust" and that none of the shortfalls or discrepancies in sub-postmasters' branch accounts were due to problems caused by Horizon. Sub-postmasters unwilling or unable to make good the shortfalls were sometimes prosecuted (by the Post Office's in-house prosecution team) for theft, false accounting and/or fraud. Between 1991 and 2015, there were 918 successful prosecutions. These were largely private prosecutions by the Post Office relying on IT evidence alone, without proof of criminal intent. Public prosecutions also occurred in Scotland, Northern Ireland and in Crown Courts. Despite this, some sub-postmasters were successfully persuaded by their own solicitors to plead guilty to false accounting, on being told the Post Office would drop theft charges. Once the Post Office had a criminal conviction, it would attempt to secure a Proceeds of Crime Act Order against convicted sub-postmasters, allowing it to seize their assets and bankrupt them. According to press reports, these actions by the Post Office caused the loss of dozens of jobs, bankruptcy, divorce, unwarranted prison sentences and one documented suicide.				
1999	Barry George	Murder of Jill Dando	London	Life imprisonment	7 years	Yes, 2008
1999	Barry George	Barry George was arrested and charged in 2000 over the 1999 murder of TV presenter Jill Dando. He was sentenced in 2001, but had his conviction quashed in 2007 and was fully exonerated in 2008 after a retrial in which police were unable to rely on discredited forensic evidence.				
2001	Shirley and Lynette Banfield	Murder	Harrow, London	Life imprisonment	1 year	Yes, (Note: Even though the defence said that the likelihood was that "one or other" of the women killed the man, the Court of Appeal ordered their release as they had been convicted under joint enterprise, and there was insufficient evidence that both had committed the murder) 2013
2001	Shirley and Lynette Banfield	A mother and daughter who were convicted of the murder of their husband/father after it was found that they had financially gained from his disappearance in 2001, had tried to murder him on previous occasions, and had lied about seeing him in 2008. They pled guilty to fraud, forgery and conspiracy to pervert the course of justice and were found guilty of the murder. They were released on appeal one year later, even though their defence said that the "likelihood" was that "one or other" of the women had murdered him, as they had been convicted under joint enterprise and the judges said that the case required the "application of the established law" and ruled that there was insufficient evidence to prove that they had both acted together to kill him.				
2003	Andrew Malkinson	Rape	Salford, Manchester	Life imprisonment	17 years (Released in 2020)	Yes, 2023
2003	Andrew Malkinson	Andrew Malkinson was convicted of rape in 2004. Initially sentenced to a minimum term of 6½ years, his insistence on being innocent saw him continue to be jailed until 2020 when he was released for good behaviour. He would make multiple appeals, with his conviction finally being quashed in 2023 on the basis of re-examined DNA samples. Another man, Paul Quinn, was convicted of the crime in 2026.				
2004	Sam Hallam	Murder	London	Minimum of 12 years' imprisonment	7 years	Yes, 2012 (no compensation)
2004	Sam Hallam	Sam Hallam was wrongly jailed for life in 2005 for the murder of Essayas Kassahun. He was released in May 2012 after prosecutors told three senior judges that they would not oppose his appeal.				
2011	Ched Evans	Rape	Rhyl	5 years	2 years 6 months	Yes, 2016
2011	Ched Evans	Evans, a professional footballer, was convicted in 2012 of the rape of a woman. In 2015 the Criminal Cases Review Commission referred the case to the Court of Appeal, having examined new evidence from two of the complainant's previous sexual partners about her behaviour, which bore similarities to Evans's account that the Commission decided "could not reasonably be explained as a coincidence". In 2016 the Court of Appeal quashed the conviction and ordered a retrial, at which Evans was found not guilty.				
2022	Bob Stewart	Racially aggravated public order offence	Westminster, London	Fined £600	No prison time	Yes, (Note: Although it was found that Stewart's comments did amount to abuse, it was judged that they did not cause alarm or distress) 2024
2022	Bob Stewart	Conservative MP Stewart was found guilty of racial abuse after telling Bahraini refugee Sayed Alwadaei to "go back to Bahrain" in an argument outside Lancaster House in Westminster in December 2022. Alwadaei had fled Bahrain after being tortured for protesting against its regime, and said that the comments had made him feel dehumanised. Steward's conviction was subsequently quashed on the grounds that while the comments were abuse, they had not caused Mr Alwadaei harassment, alarm or distress.				

=== United States ===
Due to the high number of notable wrongful conviction cases compiled for the United States, the list can be viewed via the main article.

=== Vietnam ===
Date of crime	Defendant(s)	Crime	Location	Sentence	Time served	Legally exonerated
August 15, 2003	Nguyen Thanh Chan	Murder of a woman	Me village in Nghĩa Trung, Bắc Giang, Northern Vietnam	Life	10 years	Yes
August 15, 2003	Nguyen Thanh Chan	Chan was arrested in 2003 for the murder of Nguyen Thi Hoan. He was convicted and sentenced to life imprisonment and had to pay 35 million Vietnamese đồng (about US$1,600) to the victim's family. His wife Nguyen Thi Chien continued to fight for his innocence and in July 2013 presented evidence to the courts showing that another man in the same commune, Ly Nguyen Chung, had committed the crime. Chung was arrested by the police and admitted the murder in November 2013. Chan was acquitted.				

=== Zimbabwe ===
Date of crime	Defendant(s)	Crime	Location	Sentence	Time served	Legally exonerated
July 31, 2020	Tsitsi Dangarembga, Julie Barnes	Incitement to violence*	Harare	Six months (suspended)	None	Yes
July 31, 2020	Tsitsi Dangarembga, Julie Barnes	Dangarembga and Barnes were arrested for a protest march during which they held up placards demanding the release of Hopewell Chin'ono and calling for political reform. Despite the peaceful nature of the march, the two women were convicted by a magistrates' court of inciting violence by carrying placards which "could have caused a breach of the peace". Many human rights organisations said the charges were part of a crackdown by president Emmerson Mnangagwa on opposition campaigners. In 2023 the Zimbabwe High Court overturned both convictions having found no evidence of wrongdoing.				

== See also ==
- Prosecutorial misconduct
- Exculpatory evidence
- Innocence Project
- Race in the United States criminal justice system
- Capital punishment in the United States
- Innocent prisoner's dilemma
- Miscarriage of justice
- False confession
- Overturned convictions in the United States
- Capital punishment debate in the United States
- List of exonerated death row inmates
- Wrongful execution
