= Stockwell Six =

Group of six black British men wrongly convicted of assault

The Stockwell Six are a group of British men who were put on trial for attempted robbery in 1972. Five of them were convicted, but all of their convictions were later overturned after it was determined that they had been framed by Transport Police officer Derek Ridgewell.

== Arrests ==
Courtney Harriot, Paul Green and Cleveland Davidson were arrested on the London Underground in February 1972 after travelling from Stockwell tube station. They were aged from 17 to 20 at the time.

== Trial ==
They were tried on charges of assault with intend to rob British Transport Police Detective Sergeant Derek Ridgewell. Ridgewell claimed that Courtney Harriot and his friends has accosted him on an underground train between Stockwell and Oval tube station. Ridgewell claimed that Harriot had snapped fingers at him and said "Give me some bread, man" then produced a knife and said "Your wallet or it's this!"

Ridgewell claimed he then drew his truncheon, then knocked the knife out of Harriot's hand as other undercover officers entered from adjoining compartments. He claimed that Harriot shouted "Fuzz!"

All six defendants pleaded not guilty and testified that the alleged incident had never happened and that they had been arrested at Oval tube station. They testified that police had threatened them, been violent and put words in their mouths.

=== Verdict ===
Paul Green was convicted of assault with intent to rob and sent to Borstal. Courtney Harriot was sentenced to three years in prison. Cleveland Davidson, Texo Johnson and Ronald De’Souza were convicted of related offences and Everet Mullins was found not guilty.

== Campaigns ==
In 1973 the BBC television programme Nationwide investigated the case and concluded that Ridgewell's account couldn't be true, as there was not enough time for the events to happen in an Underground stop that took place in less than two minutes.

== Derek Ridgewell ==
Derek Ridgewell was involved in a number of controversial high-profile cases in the early 1970s, until the "Tottenham Court Road Two" were acquitted in 1973. He was then moved into a department investigating mailbag theft where he worked with two criminals to split material stolen from mailbags.

He hid the profits of his crimes in five bank accounts, one in Zürich and a bank deposit box.

He stole over £1m sterling (approx £4m sterling in 2021). Although just a detective sergeant, he owned property and businesses.

Ridgewell was convicted of theft in 1980 and sentenced to seven years. The governor of Ford prison asked Ridgewell why he had committed crimes, to which Ridgewell replied "I just went bent". He died in prison in 1982, reportedly of a heart attack, possibly murdered, aged 37.

== Convictions overturned ==
In July 2021 Courtney Harriot, Paul Green and Cleveland Davidson were acquitted at the Royal Courts of Justice. The two other members of the Stockwell Six who were convicted had not then been traced. In November 2021 Texo Johnson‘s conviction was also quashed by the Court of Appeal.

Sir Julian Flaux sat with Mr Justice Linden and Mr Justice Wall and said "It is most unfortunate that it has taken nearly 50 years to rectify the injustice suffered by these appellants". He added "These appeals are allowed and the convictions are quashed."

Ronald de Souza was traced as a result of a call from the Criminal Cases Review Commission for him to come forward, and he applied in December 2024 for his case to be reviewed. In January 2025 the CCRC confirmed it had referred his case back to the Court of Appeal. In July 2025 his conviction was overturned.

== Aftermath ==
Cleveland Davidson said after the hearing: "For 50 years, it affected me … I haven’t been the same. My family didn’t believe me, no one believed me because they thought ‘well, you must’ve done something’. We just happened to be at the wrong place at the wrong time with a bad, corrupt police officer." He described Ridgewell as a "corrupt and wicked and evil police officer".

In November 2021, Lucy D'Orsi, the British Transport Police chief constable, apologised to black community in the United Kingdom "for the trauma suffered by the British African community through the criminal actions" of Ridgewell, adding that "In particular, it is of regret that we did not act sooner to end his criminalisation of British Africans, which led to the conviction of innocent people", and said his actions did "not define the BTP of today".

== See also ==
- Oval Four – four other men convicted by testimony of Ridgewell and who successfully appealed against their convictions.
