= Barbara Gray =

Barbara Gray may refer to:

- Barbara Gray (police officer), officer with the Police Service of Northern Ireland
- Barbara Gray (urban planner)
- Barbara Gray (politician), member of the Massachusetts House of Representatives
- Barbara Gray, lead character of the British TV series Nanny
