= Oval Four =

Black Britons wrongfully convicted in 1972

The Oval Four are four black British men—Winston Trew, Sterling Christie, George Griffiths and Constantine "Omar" Boucher—who were arrested by police at London's Oval tube station in March 1972 supposedly on suspicion of stealing passengers' handbags. The four were held overnight, and their trial eventually lasted five weeks. They were all found guilty of assaulting police officers and attempted theft in November 1972 and received sentences of two years in prison. Following an appeal led by John Platts-Mills, QC, their sentences were later reduced to eight months, albeit the convictions themselves were upheld, and Lord Justice Haymes commented that the reduction did not ameliorate the seriousness of their crimes. Christie was also convicted of stealing a female police officer's handbag. All four men subsequently appealed, which failed.

The officer responsible for their arrest, who was also the chief prosecution witness at their subsequent trial—Detective Sergeant Derek Ridgewell of the British Transport Police (Note: Ridgwell had briefly served in the British South Africa Police in Southern Rhodesia (now Zimbabwe) in 1965.)—was later tried and convicted for conspiracy to rob from the Royal Mail in 1980, for which he received a seven-year sentence. (Note: When the Prison Governor asked Ridgewell how his career had ended up as it had, the ex-officer replied "I just went bent".) The Criminal Cases Review Commission (CCRC) argues that Ridgewell—in charge of a group of undercover officers known as the Northern Line "Mugging Squad"— was known to confront young black men at tube stations, accuse them of theft, and then arrest them for resisting arrest, which he would back up with fictional, incriminatory remarks from the prisoner. (Note: The Guardian notes, for context, that "At the time, mugging was a high-profile issue and routinely blamed on young black men".) If they resisted, a charge of assaulting a police officer was added to the charge sheet. This led to a number of "high-profile" cases, which began attracting attention after a judge threw out Ridgewell's case against two Jesuit students studying at Oxford University. (Note: Other cases overturned were those of the Waterloo Four, the Stockwell Six and the Tottenham Court Road Two.) The judge, Gwynn Morris summed up: "I find it terrible that, here in London, people using public transport should be pounced upon by police officers without a word."

== Campaign for justice and quashing of the conviction ==
The following decades saw a campaign develop for the men's convictions to be examined, which included demonstrations and public meetings at Lambeth Town Hall. As a result of Ridgewell's corruption the four men's case was returned to the Court of Appeal in October 2019, which indicated that the case would review Ridgewell's "integrity". A number of Ridgewell's other cases had recently come before the appeal court, such as that of businessman Stephen Simmons who was also found to have been framed. (Note: Simmons was approached and arrested while sitting in a car with three other white men in south London.) Their convictions were quashed on 5 December 2019 by Lord Chief Justice, Lord Burnett, in a judgement given alongside Mrs Justice McGowan and Sir Roderick Evans. Burnett stated that the appeal court recognised "an accumulating body of evidence that points to the fundamental unreliability of evidence given by DS Ridgewell...and others of this specialist group". The four men were all aged between 19 and 23 when they were arrested by police investigating crime on London Underground; Trew later claimed that they were all "given a good hiding there to confess to things we didn't do". The CCRC supported Trew's and Christie's appeal, although noted that they had not been able to discover the whereabouts of Griffiths or Boucher, whom they believed to have emigrated later that decade. Their cases will remain available to prosecute should they request it, said the CCRC, who made the referral, they said, because "the commission considers there is a real possibility that the court will quash the conviction on the basis of new evidence and arguments concerning the integrity of DS Ridgewell." They also suggested that the appeal had "potential significance" for others convicted following Ridgewell's investigation or testimony.

In November 2021, Lucy D'Orsi, chief constable of the British Transport Police, apologised to the black community in the United Kingdom "for the trauma suffered by the British African community through the criminal actions" of Ridgewell, adding that "In particular, it is of regret that we did not act sooner to end his criminalisation of British Africans, which led to the conviction of innocent people", and said his actions did "not define the BTP of today".

== Related cases ==
The similar "Stockwell Six" case also involved Derek Ridgewell.
