= HNLMS Amsterdam (A836) =

Dutch and Peruvian naval ship (1995–pres.)

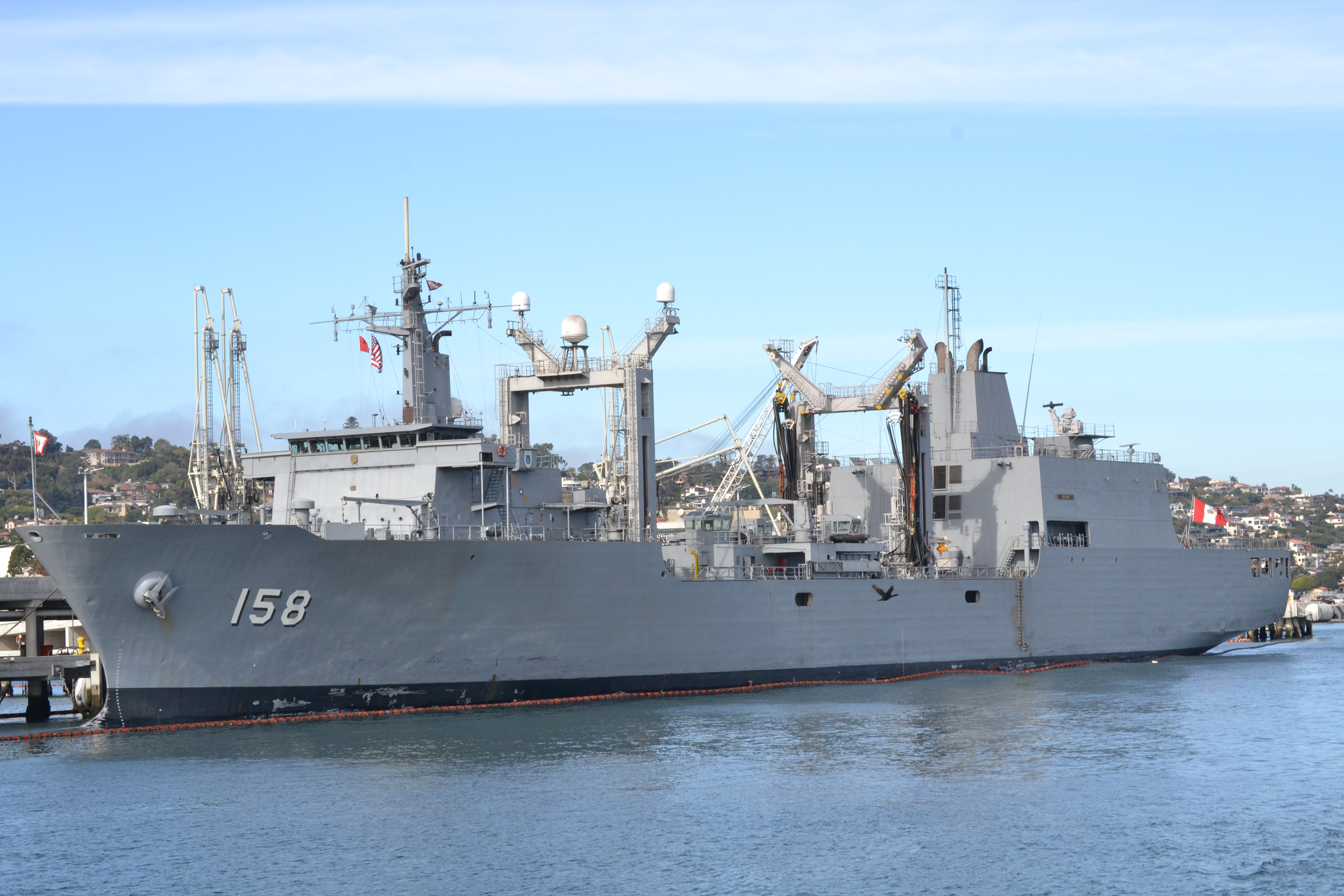
- BAP Tacna at San Diego in November 2024

Class overview
- Name: Amsterdam class
- Builders: Damen Schelde Naval Shipbuilding, Vlissingen
- Operators: Royal Netherlands Navy; Peruvian Navy
- Preceded by: HNLMS Poolster
- Succeeded by: HNLMS Den Helder
- Built: 1992–1995
- In service: 1995–present
- In commission: 1995–present
- Planned: 2
- Completed: 1
- Canceled: 1
- Active: 1

History

Netherlands
- Name: Amsterdam
- Namesake: City of Amsterdam
- Ordered: October 1991
- Builder: Royal Schelde, Vlissingen
- Laid down: 25 May 1992
- Launched: 11 September 1993
- Commissioned: 2 September 1995
- Decommissioned: 4 December 2014
- Stricken: 2014
- Identification: Hull number: A836
- Fate: Sold to Peru in 2014

Peru
- Name: BAP Tacna
- Namesake: Tacna
- Acquired: July 2014
- Commissioned: 4 December 2014
- Identification: Hull number: ARL-158; IMO number: 9052903; MMSI number: 760126000; Callsign: OBPQ
- Status: In active service

General characteristics
- Type: Replenishment oiler
- Displacement: 17,040 t (16,771 long tons)
- Length: 165.84 m (544 ft 1 in)
- Beam: 23.70 m (77 ft 9 in)
- Draught: 8 m (26 ft 3 in)
- Installed power: 19,567 kW (26,240 hp)
- Propulsion: IZAR/Burmeister & Wain diesels
- Speed: 21 knots (39 km/h; 24 mph)
- Range: 13,440 nautical miles (24,890 km; 15,470 mi) at 20 knots
- Capacity: 8,750 tonnes of diesel oil; 1,200 tonnes of aviation fuel; 500 tonnes of cargo
- Complement: 160
- Electronic warfare & decoys: Radar interception system; Chaff
- Armament: 1 × 30 mm (1.2 in) Goalkeeper CIWS; 6 × M2-HB 12.7 mm (0.50 in) machine guns; 2 x MAG 7.62 mm machine guns
- Aircraft carried: 4 × Lynx or 3 × NH-90 helicopters

HNLMS Amsterdam was the last replenishment oiler serving with the Royal Netherlands Navy. Amsterdam entered service on 2 September 1995 and replaced HNLMS Poolster. On 4 December 2014 it was decommissioned and sold to the Peruvian Navy where it was renamed BAP Tacna.

== Design and description ==
Amsterdam is a replenishment oiler that was designed to replace the ageing HNLMS Poolster. The result of a joint effort between the Nevesbu and Spanish E.N. Bazàn (later IZAR, then Navantia) design bureaus, the vessel was one of three ordered; two by the Netherlands and one (Patiño) by Spain to a modified design. The second vessel planned by the Netherlands was cancelled. Amsterdam measures 165.84 m (544 ft 1 in) long and 156.00 m (511 ft 10 in) at the waterline with a maximum beam of 23.70 m (77.8 ft) and 22.00 m (72.18 ft) at the waterline and a draught of 8.00 m (26.25 ft). (Note: The measurements of the ship differ between the sources. Saunders has Amsterdam's length as 166 m (544 ft 7 in) with a 22 m (72 ft 2 in) beam and a draught of 8 m (26 ft). Marineschepen has the vessel as 166 m long with a beam of 22 m and a draught of 7.9 m (26 ft).) The ship has a displacement of 17,040 t (16,770 long tons) fully loaded. Amsterdam was constructed to merchant ship standards with military nuclear, biological and chemical damage control.

Amsterdam is propelled by a single five-bladed 5.7 m (19 ft)-diameter LIPS controllable pitch propeller powered by two IZAR/Burmeister & Wain V16V 40/45 diesel engines creating 19,570 kW (26,240 shp). (Note: Saunders has the engines made by Bazàn/Burmeister & Wain, which was the predecessor company of IZAR. Marineschepen has the engines constructed by Bazàn/MAN.) This gives the ship a maximum speed of 21 kn (39 km/h; 24 mph) with a sustained speed of 20 kn (37 km/h; 23 mph). The vessel has a range of 13,440 nmi (24,890 km; 15,470 mi) at 20 knots and can stay at sea for 30 days. Amsterdam is equipped with four 1,000 kW (1,300 hp) IZAR/Burmeister & Wain generators for power generation. The ship has a complement of 23 officers and 137 enlisted with an additional 70 spare berths. The aviation complement of 24 is included in the overall number. The vessel was designed with up to 20% of its crew be female.

The ship was initially armed with two Oerlikon 20 mm (0.79 in) cannon and one Signaal Goalkeeper 30 mm (1.2 in) close-in weapon system (CIWS). The 20 mm cannon were later removed and replaced six single-mounted 12.7 mm (0.50 in) Browning M2 and two MAG 7.62mm machine guns. Amsterdam also mounts four Mark 36 SRBOC chaff decoy launchers and a Nixie towed torpedo decoy system. The replenishment oiler mounts Ferranti AWARE-4 ESM radar warning and two Kelvin Hughes surface search and helicopter control radars. The ship was capable of operating three Westland Lynx or two AgustaWestland AW101/Westland Sea King/NHIndustries NH90 helicopters from its flight deck in Dutch service.

The replenishment oiler is capacity for 10,300 tons deadweight (DWT). The vessel's typical cargo inventory consisted of 8,750 t (8,610 long tons; 9,650 short tons) of diesel fuel, 1,200 t (1,200 long tons; 1,300 short tons) of aviation fuel, 178.8 t (176.0 long tons) of fresh water, 180.9 t (178.0 long tons; 199.4 short tons) of ammunition, 18.6 t (18.3 long tons; 20.5 short tons) of sonobuoys, 83.3 t (82.0 long tons; 91.8 short tons) of provisions and 9 t (8.9 long tons; 9.9 short tons) of spare parts. The ship also contained repair shops to aid the fleet. Amsterdam has four 2-ton dual-purpose and two 250-kilogram solid stores alongside replenishment stations on each side of the ship and a vertical replenishment station forward. The vessel has a fuel transfer rate of 1,000 m^{3} (35,000 cu ft) per hour on its port side stations, 600 m^{3} (21,000 cu ft) per hour on its starboard stations and 450 m^{3} (16,000 cu ft) per hour astern. Amsterdam is also capable of transferring 200 m^{3} (7,100 cu ft) per hour of aviation fuel on either side.

== Service history ==
=== Dutch service ===
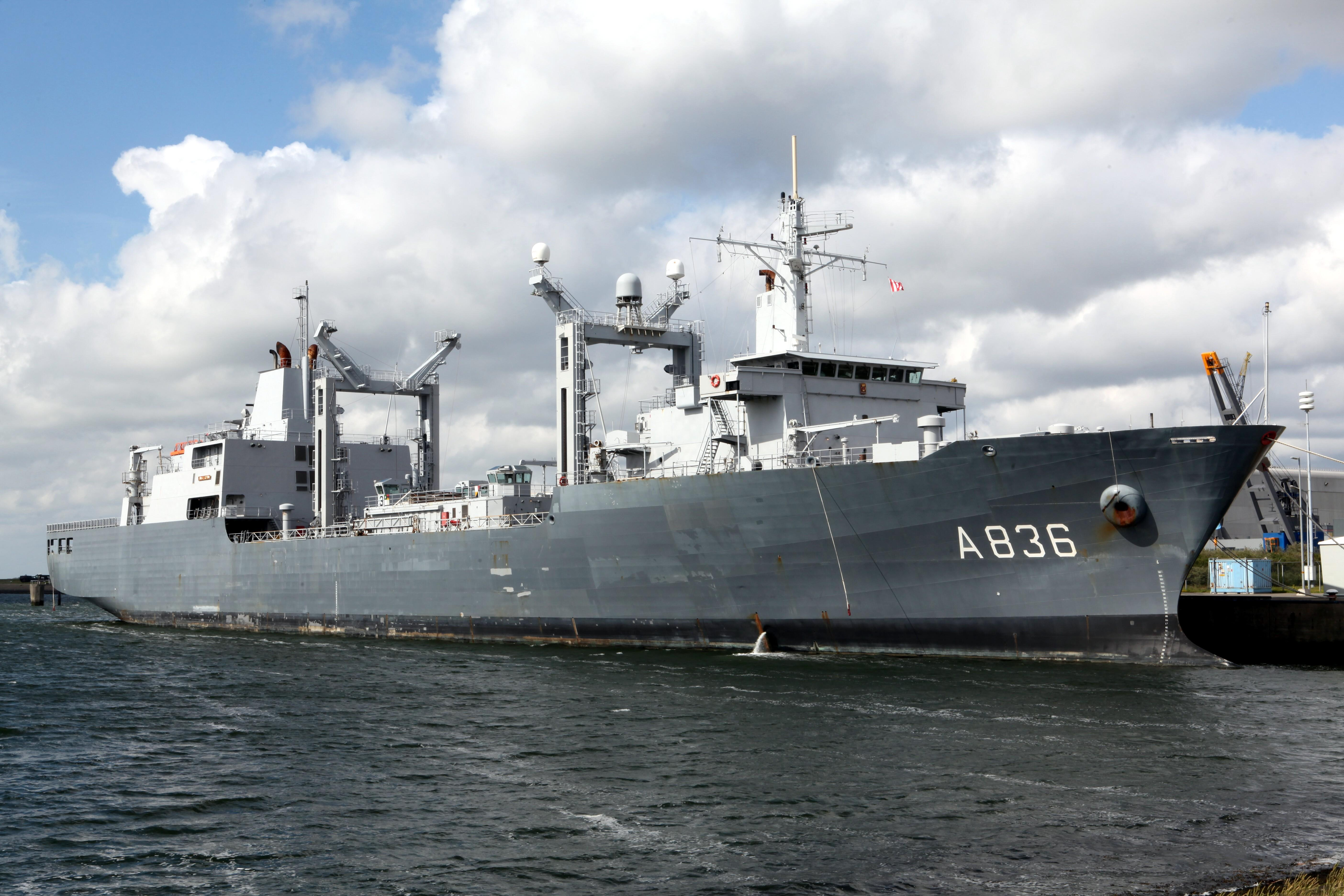
Amsterdam on 2 July 2011

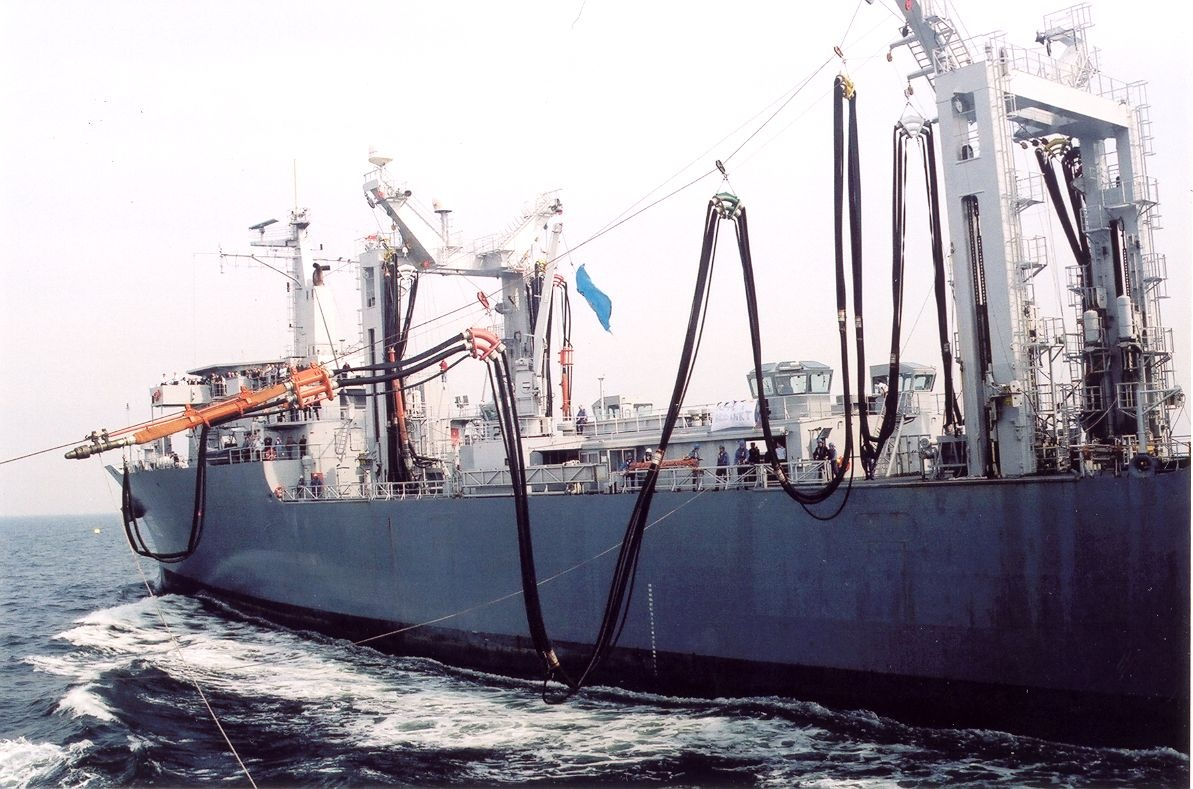
HNLMS Amsterdam in 2004

The ship was ordered in October 1991 as a replacement for the ageing HNLMS Poolster. The hull was constructed by B.Y. Merwede in Hardinxveld, the Netherlands, with the keel being laid down on 25 May 1992 and launched on 11 September 1993. The hull was taken to the Royal Schelde shipyard in Vlissingen to be completed and began sea trials on 3 April 1995. The vessel was accepted by the Royal Netherlands Navy on 10 July 1995 and Amsterdam was commissioned on 2 September 1995.

In early 1996, the ship sailed to the Arctic for tests on operations in cold climates, later in the year operating of the Iberian Peninsula with other Dutch warships. In 1997, the ship sailed to Singapore and Abu Dhabi for defence expositions. In 1998, Amsterdam was one of the Dutch warships that participated in one of the largest NATO military exercises to that date off Spain. In 2000, the ship sailed with a Dutch squadron, visiting several Asian countries. In August, the ship performed its 1,000 replenishment at sea.

In November 2001, Amsterdam was assigned to NATO's Standing Naval Force Atlantic (STANAVFORLANT). In December, Amsterdam and the frigate HNLMS Jacob van Heemskerck transferred to the Mediterranean Sea as part of Standing Naval Force Mediterranean to take part in NATO's Operation Active Endeavour, patrolling the eastern Mediterranean. On 2 January 2002, the ship recovered 20 refugees from Mediterranean waters after being taken off their ship in heavy weather. The vessel returned to the Netherlands in late January. From April to June, Amsterdam was in the Mediterranean again as part of Active Endeavour. In 2003, the replenishment oiler took part in the military exercise Northern Light off the coast of Scotland and joined STANAVFORLANT for naval exercises in 2004. This was followed by a deployment to Curacao in the Caribbean Sea to take over station duties until 2005, when the ship returned to European waters.

Amsterdam deployed to the Middle East as part of Operation Enduring Freedom during 2005/2006 and provided assistance to two US naval vessels after a battle they had fought with pirates on 18 March 2006. In 2008, the vessel was part of a UNIFIL mission to Lebanon. The vessel then returned to Caribbean waters, operating with British, French, Canadian and American forces in the region. From September 2010 to January 2011, Amsterdam was assigned to Operation Atalanta and Operation Shield off the coast of Somalia. The ship was assigned in December 2010 to the coast of Côte d'Ivoire in order to assist in a possible evacuation of European Union citizens from the country in the wake of unrest after the 2010 presidential election.

In 2012–2013, Amsterdam was assigned to the Dutch Caribbean force, intercepting drug smugglers, before returning to the Mediterranean in mid-2014. The ship was sold to Peru in July 2014. Amsterdam was decommissioned on 4 December 2014 and transferred to the Peruvian Navy.

=== Peruvian service ===
Amsterdam was acquired by the Peruvian Navy in July 2014. It was delivered to the navy on 4 December 2014 and commissioned as Tacna, for the border city Tacna, with the number ARL 158. The vessel was part of the revamp of the navy.

== Bibliography ==
- "Amsterdam bevoorradingsschip" [Amsterdam supply ship]. marineschepen.nl (in Dutch). 15 February 2018.
- Saunders, Stephen, ed. (2009). Jane's Fighting Ships 2009–2010 (112th ed.). Alexandria, Virginia: Janes Information Services. ISBN 978-0-7106-2888-6.
- Wertheim, Eric, ed. (2013). The Naval Institute Guide to Combat Fleets of the World (16th ed.). Annapolis, Maryland: Naval Institute Press. ISBN 9-7-815911-4954-5.
