= 61016 =

Non-emergency SMS service on British railways

61016 (Note: Normally read in official announcements as "six-one-oh-one-six" or "six-one-zero-one-six"; however, official announcements may have different wording but still keep the 'See it. Say it. Sorted.' slogan.) (Note: 61016 should not be confused with 80110; that is used for questions or general advice, not reporting incidents.) is a British Transport Police (BTP) SMS text message service for reporting non-emergency incidents on Great Britain's railways. Launched in 2013, the 24/7 service allows members of the public to contact BTP via text about non-emergency matters at any time. The service received 255,000 reports in 2025 and has featured in BTP publicity alongside the slogan "See it. Say it. Sorted."

== History ==
=== Introduction ===
The 61016 service was introduced in 2013 to provide rail users with a discreet way to contact BTP via text message to share non-emergency concerns like suspicious activity and anti-social behaviour while travelling. It operates 24/7 and 365 days-a-year and aims to improve reporting and detection of crime on Britain's railways.

=== 'See It. Say It. Sorted.' introduction ===
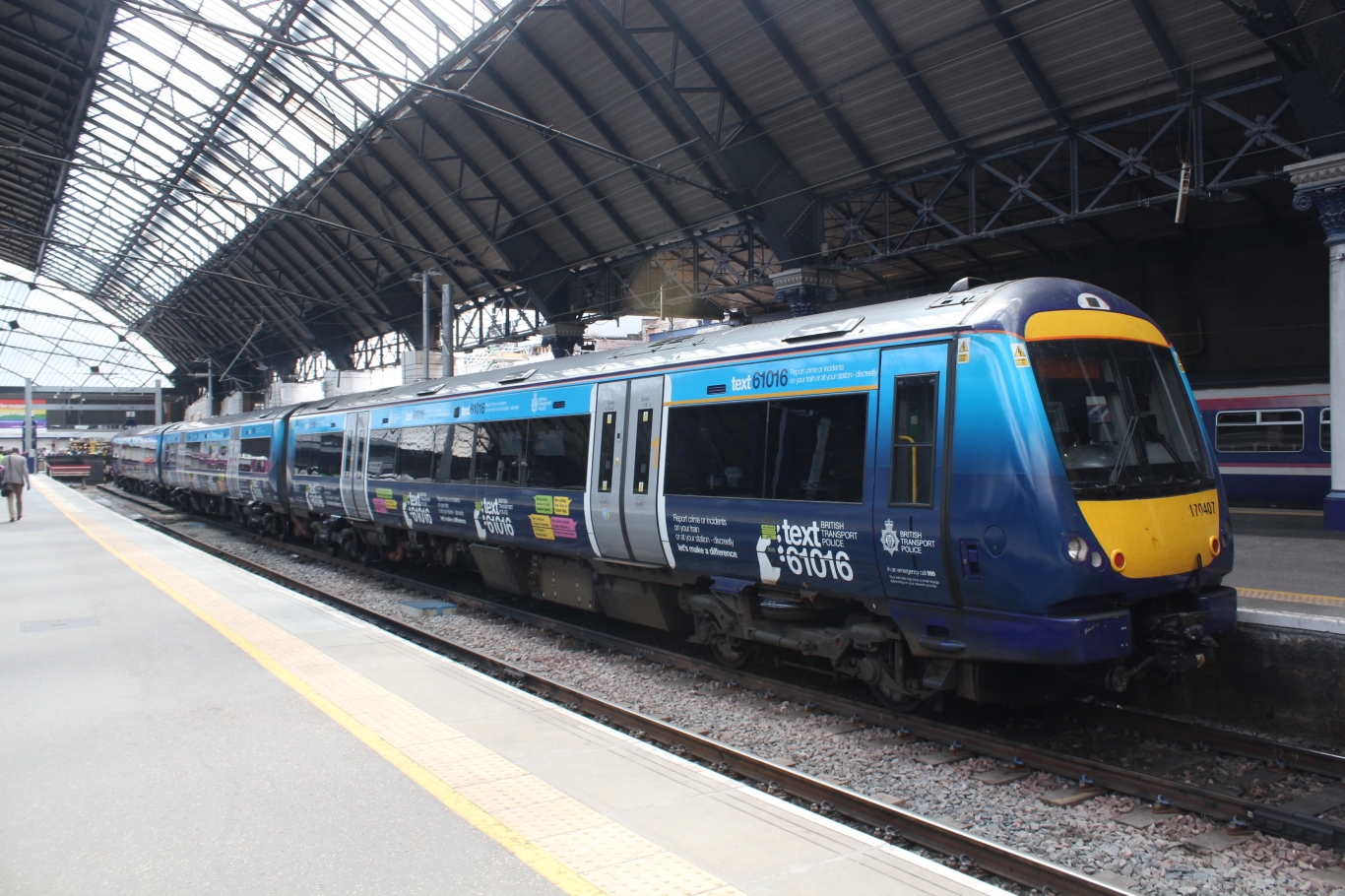
An Abellio ScotRail train with BTP advertising, showing the 61016 non-emergency number

By 2016, the service had expanded, introducing the "See it. Say it. Sorted." campaign. It urged passengers to report suspicious behaviour via text message. As part of the new campaign, train companies started playing the campaign slogan in trains and at stations:

"If you see something that doesn't look right, speak to staff or text the British Transport Police on 61016. We'll sort it. See it. Say it. Sorted."

The 61016 number continues to be highlighted across trains, stations, and announcements to help improve public safety.

=== 'See it. Say it. Sorted.' refresh ===
In 2025, the 'See it. Say it. Sorted.' campaign was updated. The refresh featured new posters and announcements, with the announcements having been rewritten and the wording made sharper. A Network Rail spokesperson said the refresh "will ultimately keep our railway running reliably by encouraging passengers to be our eyes and ears", as well as mentioning how this new change would be rolled in gradually across Great Britain.

== Efficacy and reception ==
=== Statistics ===
In its first year of operation the service received over 4,000 messages. In 2015, BTP aimed for 61016 to reduce crime by 20%, reduce crime-related disruption by 20%, and increase staff and passenger confidence by 10% (also known as 20:20:10), while additionally adding "value for money". In 2017, the 20:20:10 strategy was retired to avoid encouraging undesirable behaviours and taking police away from where they are needed most to pursue binary numerical targets. In addition, while "value for money" is no longer an objective for the British Transport Police Authority, its BTP Strategy 2026–2029 does identify driving productivity through innovation as a strategic objective.

In 2022, BTP received 472 reports of sexual harassment, 540 incidents categorised as sexual offences, 573 hate crimes, and 434 reports of theft via the text service. In March 2023, BTP announced that more than 668,000 texts had been sent to the service in its first ten years. In 2023, there were 320 reports of sexual offences and harassment in London by females under the age of 19, an increase of 33% over the previous year. By 2023, a text was sent to 61016 and received by BTP's contact centre every two minutes during daytime. By 2025, reports to the 61016 service had increased to 255,000 per year.

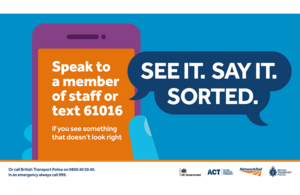
A refreshed poster, launched in September 2025, for the 61016 "See it. Say it. Sorted." campaign

=== Reception ===
BTP continues to promote crime awareness with 61016, as victims of sexual harassment have said they were unaware of the service as recently as of 2024. While use of the service has continued to grow over time and has been reported on positively, the "See it. Say it. Sorted" campaign has also been described as "the most irritating slogan in the history of British transport". Passengers have commented that the station and train announcements were "becoming too frequent and a bit annoying."

=== UK mobile networks collaboration ===
In 2024, BTP collaborated with Three UK, EE, O2 and Vodafone to make the 61016 service free of charge on major UK networks. This has reduced barriers to reporting while ensuring that individuals are able to contact BTP without facing mobile charges on all but some limited mobile networks. In some instances, if someone has blocked premium rate numbers who might not be able text 61016.

== Process and reporting ==
When someone texts 61016, the text is sent to the First Contact Centre in Birmingham with operators responding and able to dispatch BTP officers as appropriate. The sender will receive a text confirming that BTP has received their message and the report is then logged for the police to be able to handle and follow up the incident.

61016 is used alongside the 0800 40 50 40 BTP phone number which serves the same purpose but for phone calls, as well as the 999 and 101 numbers for emergency and non-emergency police, respectively.

Previously, passengers were also able report crime with the Railway Guardian App in a similar way to texting 61016 as well as report anonymously to Crimestoppers. The Railway Guardian App is no longer in service, as it had transitioned to now 'imabi Travel Guardian' after 3 years of BTP licensing the app. You can still report with 61016 via the 'report' feature in the app — reports can still be made using the National Rail App alternatively.
