= Office of Rail and Road =

UK government non-ministerial department

Agency overview
- Formed: 5 July 2004; 21 years ago
- Preceding agency: Office of the Rail Regulator
- Type: Non-ministerial government department
- Jurisdiction: United Kingdom
- Headquarters: Cabot Square, London
- Employees: 370 (2022/23)
- Annual budget: £30 million
- Agency executives: Declan Collier, chair; Feras Alshaker, interim CEO
- Key document: Railways and Transport Safety Act 2003
- Website: orr.gov.uk

The Office of Rail and Road (ORR) is a non-ministerial government department responsible for the economic and safety regulation of Great Britain's railways, and the economic monitoring of National Highways.

ORR regulates Network Rail by setting its activities and funding requirements for each Control Period, ensuring train operators have fair access to the railway network, and enforcing compliance with its network licence. ORR also regulates High Speed 1, the Channel Tunnel, and also acts as the appeal body, controls the network statement and monitors the competitive situation of rail services in Northern Ireland. It is the competition authority for the railways and enforces consumer protection law in relation to the railways. ORR's role is expected to reduce as part of the transition from Network Rail to Great British Railways.

From April 2015, ORR assumed responsibility for monitoring National Highways' management of the strategic road network – the motorways and main A roads in England – and advising the Secretary of State for Transport on the levels of funding and performance requirements for each Road Period.

== History ==
ORR was established as the Office of Rail Regulation on 5 July 2004 by the Railways and Transport Safety Act 2003, replacing the Rail Regulator. It became the Office of Rail and Road on 1 April 2015 following ORR's appointment as Monitor for National Highways under the Infrastructure Act 2015.

== Functions ==
=== Network Rail ===
Network Rail – the owner and operator of most of the railway network in England, Scotland and Wales – operates under a network licence. ORR holds Network Rail to account through the network licence which includes conditions relating to its management of the railway network, information provision and safety obligations.

ORR is also responsible for setting Network Rail's outputs and funding requirement for each Control Period, including the access charges paid by train and freight operating companies to Network Rail for the use of its infrastructure. ORR then holds Network Rail to account against the delivery, performance and service levels set out in its final determination.

ORR is concerned with the regulation of Network Rail as the monopoly owner of much of Britain's railway infrastructure. It does not play a direct role in regulating fares; responsibility for this lies with the Department for Transport.

Proposals by the UK Government in February 2025 envisage reducing ORR's role when Great British Railways (GBR) replaces Network Rail. ORR would assess GBR's business plans, monitor major changes during the five-year cycle, and handle appeals against GBR's decisions. The functions of ORR in approving train operators' access to the network, and selling access rights, would be transferred to GBR.

=== High Speed 1 ===
ORR regulates the High Speed 1 line between St Pancras and the Channel Tunnel, which is operated by HS1 Ltd. The line is separate to the rest of the national railway network operated by Network Rail, but ORR regulates it in much the same way, including holding HS1 to account for its performance, service and value for money for passengers and the freight industry. This is not expected to change with the advent of Great British Railways.

=== Rail safety ===
ORR regulates health and safety for the entire mainline rail network in Great Britain, as well as London Underground, light rail, trams and the heritage railway sector. ORR has a team of more than 100 rail health and safety inspectors and professionals who have powers of enforcement. Their remit is to ensure that the railway is safe, and is kept safe, at a reasonably practicable cost; this is not expected to change with the advent of Great British Railways.

=== Fair access and fair treatment ===
A primary role for ORR is to enforce consumer law and compliance with the conditions contained in Network Rail's and train operators' licences, to help ensure that all rail users get the service to which they are entitled.

=== National Highways ===
National Highways operates, maintains and improves England's strategic road network, operating under a licence (managed by the Department for Transport). ORR monitors and enforces the performance and efficiency of National Highways against the outputs set out in the government's Road Investment Strategy and licence, and advises the Secretary of State for Transport on the funding levels and performance requirements for each Road Period.

== Statutory duties ==
In carrying out its railway functions, ORR must discharge its statutory duties, which are its formal objectives. These are laid down in section 4 of the Railways Act 1993, and include the protection of the interests of users and the promotion of competition, efficiency and economy in the provision of railway services.

ORR’s duties as the Monitor for National Highways are set out in section 12 of the Infrastructure Act 2015. These require that ORR must exercise its functions in the way it considers most likely to promote the performance and efficiency of National Highways. ORR also has a role within The Railways (Access, Management and Licensing of Railway Undertakings) Regulations 2016.

== Public law obligations ==
Like other public authorities, ORR must comply with the rules of administrative law, and is amenable to judicial review, so it must act lawfully, rationally, proportionately and in accordance with the relevant rules of procedure. Although operationally independent of central government as a non-ministerial government department, it is still covered by legislation such as the Freedom of Information Act 2000.

== Management ==
All members of the ORR board are appointed by the Secretary of State for Transport for a fixed term of up to five years. The current ORR chair is Declan Collier, appointed in January 2019. Feras Alshaker has been the Interim CEO since April 2026.

ORR employs approximately 350 people, with offices in London, Birmingham, Bristol, Glasgow, Manchester and York.

== Statistics ==
ORR is the main provider of railway industry statistics in Britain.

ORR publishes a range of statistics about railway performance, rail usage, the environmental impact of rail, accessibility including lifts, and safety – to support performance evaluation, analysis and decision-making for the railway industry. It produces annual usage statistics for each station.

== See also ==
- Rail transport in Great Britain
- Strategic Rail Authority
