= Barbara Gray (police officer) =

Irish police officer

Barbara Ann Gray LVO QPM is a senior police officer in the United Kingdom. Serving with the Police Service of Northern Ireland (PSNI) from 1989 onwards, she transferred to the Metropolitan Police in April 2021 as a Deputy Assistant Commissioner to fill a post left vacant by Lucy D'Orsi's appointment as Chief Constable of the British Transport Police, with her promotion to Assistant Commissioner (Professionalism) announced in September 2022.

Growing up outside Newry and studying Geography and English at the Jordanstown campus of Ulster University, she was inspired to join the Police when one of its officers was killed by a car-bomb outside her house when she was 14. She was promoted to Sergeant in 1994, moving from Dungannon to Enniskillen and then to Antrim on her promotion to Inspector (2002).

Her promotion to Chief Inspector in 2006 brought with it an appointment as Area Commander for Ballymena, prior to service as Superintendent for Armagh, Newry and Down from 2009 then for A District (i.e. north and west Belfast) from 2011. Promotion to Chief Superintendent came in 2014. She became Temporary Assistant Chief Constable in 2017, with responsibility as strategic commander for public order, firearms and CBRN response before being confirmed in that rank in June 2020.

Gray was awarded the Queen's Police Medal (QPM) in the 2016 Birthday Honours. She was appointed Lieutenant of the Royal Victorian Order (LVO) in the 2023 New Year Honours for services to royalty protection.

== Honours ==

Ribbon	Description	Notes
	Lieutenant of the Royal Victorian Order (LVO)	2023 New Year Honours
	Queen's Police Medal (QPM)	2016 New Year Honours
	Queen Elizabeth II Golden Jubilee Medal	2002; UK Version of this Medal
	Queen Elizabeth II Diamond Jubilee Medal	2012; UK Version of this Medal
	Queen Elizabeth II Platinum Jubilee Medal	2022; UK Version of this Medal
	King Charles III Coronation Medal	2023; UK Version of this Medal
	Police Long Service and Good Conduct Medal	

Royal Ulster Constabulary Service medal. Police Service of NI service medal
