= Paul Crowther (police officer) =

British police officer

Paul Crowther CBE

Chief Constable of the British Transport Police
- In office March 2014 – January 2021
- Minister: Chris Grayling
- Preceded by: Andrew Trotter
- Succeeded by: Lucy D'Orsi

Personal details
- Born: Paul Geoffrey Crowther

Paul Geoffrey Crowther CBE is a former British police officer. He served as Chief Constable of the British Transport Police (BTP) from March 2014 until his retirement in February 2021.

== Career ==
Crowther joined the British Transport Police (BTP) in 1980 and has experience in uniformed and CID posts.

In 2002, he was the Senior Investigating Officer for the Potters Bar train crash. He was appointed Chief Superintendent in charge of BTP's London Underground Area in 2004. He led BTP's initial response to the July 2005 terrorist attacks on the Tube.

He began his chief officer career as Assistant Chief Constable for the crime portfolio. He was then Deputy Chief Constable with responsibility for professional standards, strategic development, and media and marketing. On 1 May 2014, he was appointed Chief Constable of the BTP.

He is the national police lead for the Metal Theft Task Force, as well as suicide prevention and CCTV. He leads for the Association of Chief Police Officers on metal theft and digital forensic triage.

As of 2015, Crowther was paid a salary of between £190,000 and £194,999 by the force, making him one of the 328 most highly paid people in the British public sector at that time.

== Honours and awards ==
Crowther was appointed Officer of the Order of the British Empire (OBE) in the 2014 New Year Honours and Commander of the Order of the British Empire (CBE) in the 2020 New Year Honours for services to policing.

Police appointments
Preceded by Andrew Trotter	Chief Constable of British Transport Police; 2014–2021	Succeeded by Lucy D'Orsi
