= British Transport Police =

Police force responsible for railways in Britain

British Transport Police Welsh: Heddlu Trafnidiaeth Prydeinig
- Logo of the British Transport Police
- Abbreviation: BTP

Agency overview
- Formed: 1 January 1949; 77 years ago
- Preceding agencies: Great Western Railway Police; London and North Eastern Railway Police; London, Midland and Scottish Railway Police; Southern Railway Police; London Transport Police
- Annual budget: £445.2 million (2026/27)

Jurisdictional structure
- National agency (Operations jurisdiction): GB
- Operations jurisdiction: GB
- Legal jurisdiction: England and Wales; Scotland
- Governing body: British Transport Police Authority
- Constituting instruments: British Transport Commission Act 1949; Transport Police (Jurisdiction) Act 1994; Railways and Transport Safety Act 2003
- General nature: Civilian police
- Specialist jurisdiction: Railways, tramways, rail transit systems

Operational structure
- Overseen by: British Transport Police Authority; Scottish Railways Policing Committee (Scotland)
- Headquarters: 200 Buckingham Palace Road, London, SW1W 9TJ
- Police constables: 3,210 (2026)
- PCSOs: 214 (2026)
- Agency executive: Lucy D'Orsi, Chief constable
- Divisions: A Division; B Division; C Division; D Division; E Division

Website
- www.btp.police.uk

The British Transport Police (BTP; Welsh: Heddlu Trafnidiaeth Prydeinig) is a national special police force that polices the railway network of Great Britain, which consists of over 10,000 miles of track and 3,000 stations and depots. BTP also polices the London Underground, Docklands Light Railway, West Midlands Metro, London Tramlink, Glasgow Subway, parts of Tyne and Wear Metro, and the London Cable Car. It also provides the 61016 text messaging service for passengers to report non-emergency crimes and incidents.

The force is funded primarily by the rail industry, alongside funding from Transport for London (TfL).

== Jurisdiction ==
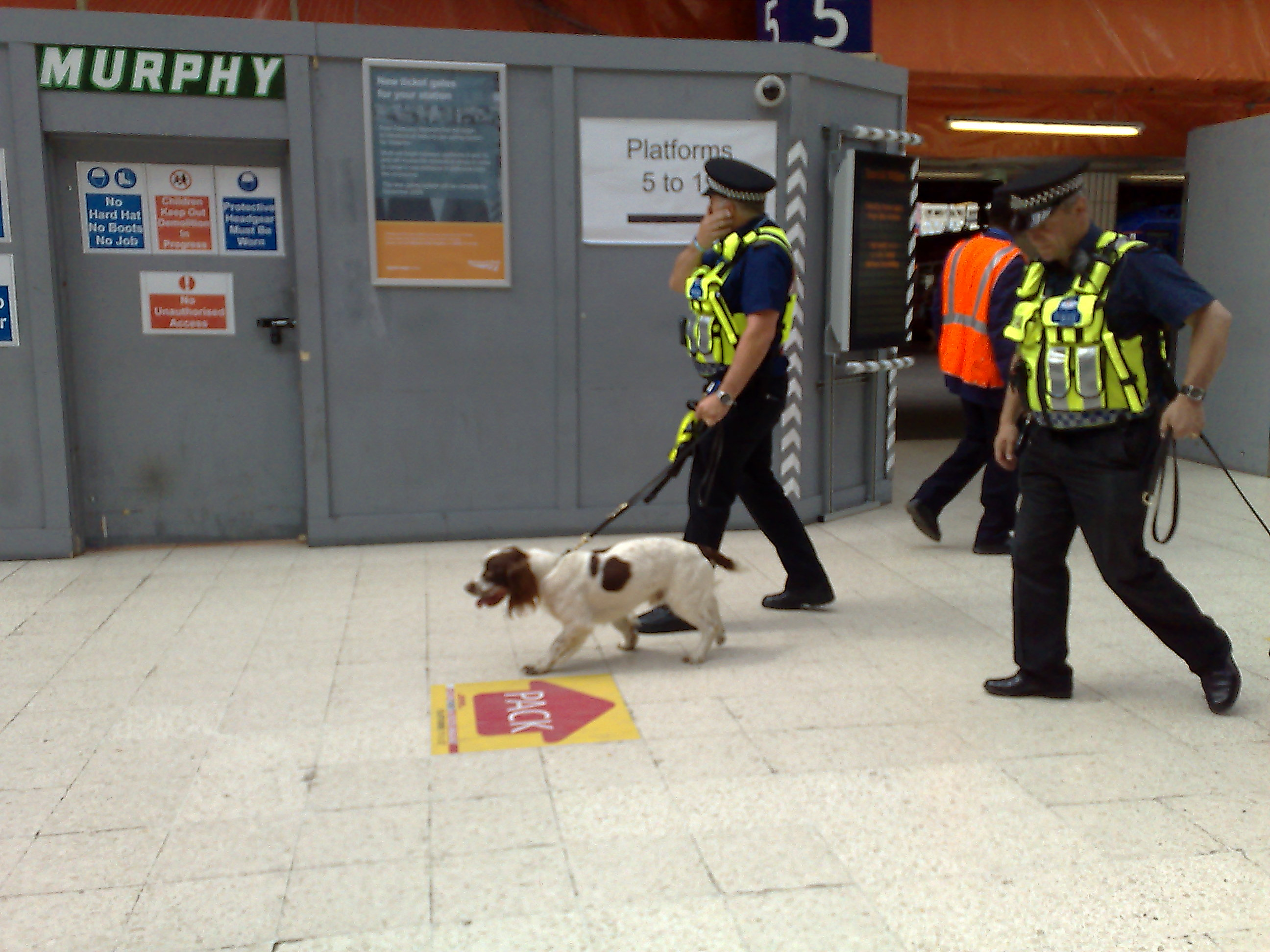
BTP officers patrolling with dogs at London Waterloo station

As well as having jurisdiction across the national rail network, BTP is also responsible for policing:

- London Underground
- Docklands Light Railway
- London Trams
- London Cable Car
- Glasgow Subway
- Tyne and Wear Metro (Sunderland only, with the majority policed by Northumbria Police)
- West Midlands Metro

This amounts to around 10,000 miles (16,000 km) of track and more than 3,000 railway stations and depots, with more than one billion passenger journeys annually on the main lines alone. BTP do not police heritage railways in Britain but do, in conjunction with the French National Police (under the Border Police unit) – Police aux Frontières – police the international services operated by Eurostar.

A BTP constable can also act as a police constable outside their normal railway jurisdiction in certain circumstances, which are generally referred to as their extended jurisdiction.

BTP constables previously had jurisdiction at docks, ports, harbours and inland waterways, as well at some bus stations and British Transport Hotels. These roles and powers were phased out in 1985 with railway privatisation and legislation was amended to reflect this in 1994.

== History ==
=== Early history ===
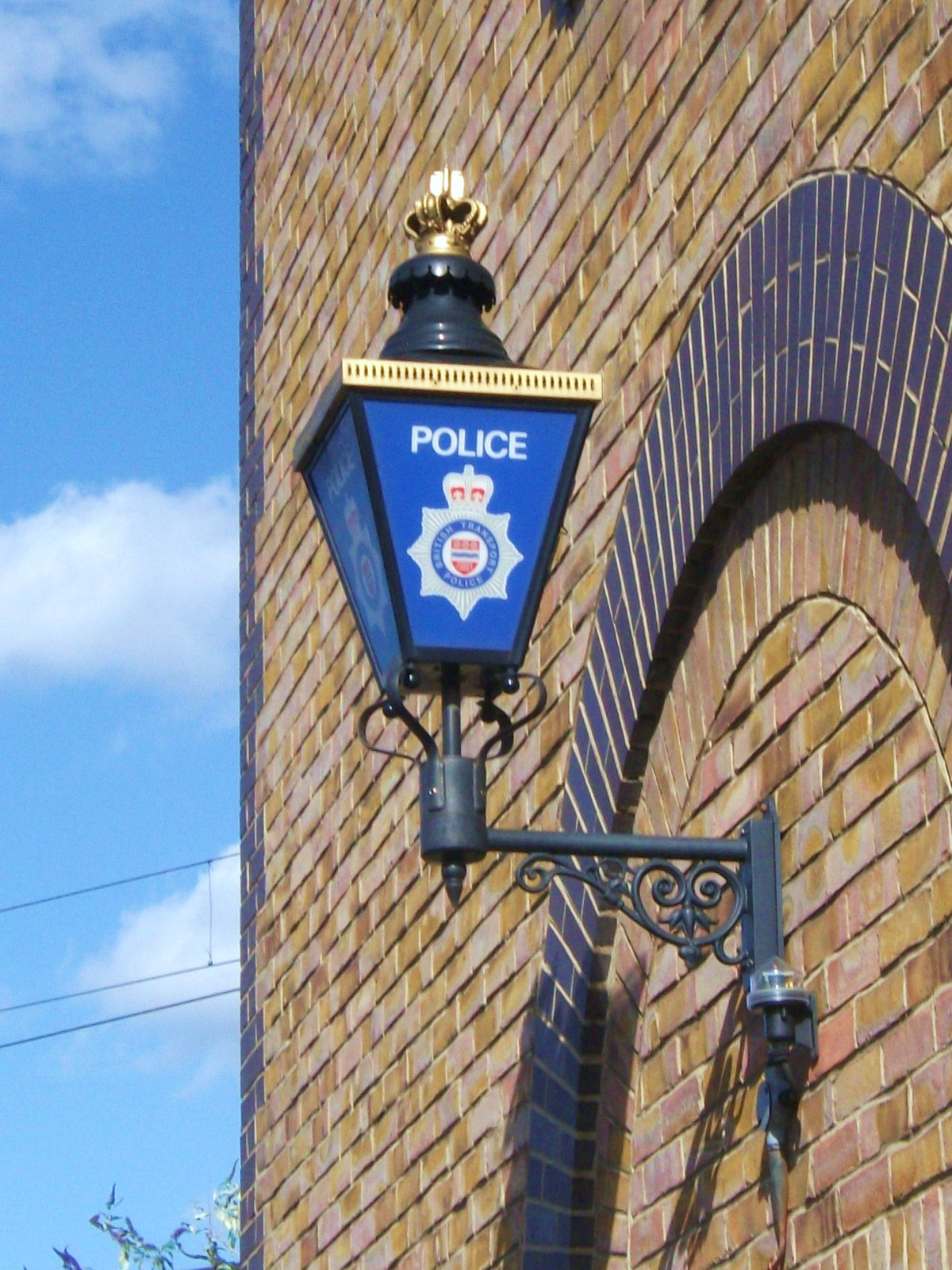
BTP Police station "blue lamp"

Private British railway companies employed detectives and police almost from the outset of passenger services in 1826. These companies were unified into four in 1923 and then into a single nationalised company by the Transport Act 1947, which also created the British Transport Commission (BTC). On 1 January 1949 the British Transport Commission Police (BTCP) was created by the British Transport Commission Act 1949 which combined the already-existing police forces inherited from the pre-nationalisation railways by British Railways as well as the London Transport Police, canal police and several minor dock forces. In 1957 the Maxwell-Johnson enquiry found that policing requirements for the railway could not be met by territorial forces and that it was essential that a specialist police force be retained. On 1 January 1962 the British Transport Commission Police ceased to cover British Waterways property and was abolished a year later in January 1963, leading to the name of the force being amended to the British Transport Police.

=== Racism ===
In the 1960s and 1970s BTP officers led by Detective Sergeant Derek Ridgewell gave false testimony to obtain convictions of young men in the British Black community on the London Underground on charges such as assault with intent to rob. Eventually some of the men, who became known as the Oval Four and Stockwell Six, managed to have their convictions overturned. In November 2021, the BTP chief constable apologised to the black community for the trauma caused by Ridgewell and said his actions did "not define the BTP of today". In July 2021 Deputy Chief Constable Adrian Hanstock stated that a review of Ridgewell's record had "not identified any additional matters that we feel should be referred for external review", this proved not to be a reliable statement as the Criminal Case Review Commission subsequently quashed the convictions of Basil Peterkin and Saliah Mehmet, 2 of 12 men convicted on Ridgewell's evidence of theft from a goods depot in 1977. The CCRC appealed for "anyone else who believes that they or a loved one, friend or acquaintance was a victim of a miscarriage of justice to contact the CCRC – particularly if DS Derek Ridgewell was involved.", In January 2025, following after the Ronald De Souza's case was quashed, the victim's solicitor stated "I am not confident that all his victims have yet been identified." and the CCRC issued a direct appeal for anyone convicted in a case involving Ridgwell to come forward if they believed they were a victim of a miscarriage of justice. That sentiment was echoed in July 2025 when the solicitor for 13th victim Errol Campbell's family stated that there were that "bound to be others".

=== Changes ===
Historically, railway policing powers were derived from a mixture of common-law constable powers, various statutory provisions, and industry agreements. In the nineteenth century, this included the use of special constables appointed by magistrates under the Special Constables Act 1838, which enabled justices of the peace to swear in and remunerate constables for the protection of public works, including railways, at the request and expense of the companies concerned. (Note: The Special Constables Act 1838 did not establish a permanent or general police force. It enabled magistrates (justices of the peace) to appoint temporary special constables with full constabulary powers to preserve the peace in connection with specified public works (including railways), typically at the request and expense of the undertakings concerned. These appointments were localised, time-limited and supervisory in nature, and did not confer an independent policing jurisdiction on companies themselves.) The modern position was consolidated and given a unified statutory footing—first through the Transport Police (Jurisdiction) Act 1994 (amending section 53 of the British Transport Commission Act 1949) and then, comprehensively, through section 31 of the Railways and Transport Safety Act 2003.

In 1984 London Buses decided not to use the British Transport Police. The British Transport Docks Board followed in 1985 when it was privatised. This included undertaking immigration control at smaller ports until the Immigration Service expanded. The force crest still includes ports and harbours. BTP left the last ports it policed in 1990.

Until the 1990s the principal investigators of railway accidents were the inspecting officers of HM Railway Inspectorate, and BTP involvement was minimal. With major accidents after the 1988 Clapham Junction rail crash being investigated by more adversarial public inquiries, BTP took on a more proactive role in crash investigations. Further reforms led to the creation by the Department for Transport of the Rail Accident Investigation Branch which now takes the lead role in investigations of accidents with BTP's support, particularly in relation to the investigation of any criminal offences.

=== 21st century ===
The force played a central role in the response to the 7 July 2005 London bombings. Three of the incidents were at London Underground stations: Edgware Road (Circle Line), Russell Square and Aldgate stations, while the Number 30 bus destroyed at Tavistock Square was very close to the then BTP headquarters, the latter incident being responded to initially by officers from the force.

In 2010, the force's dog training was moved from a force-specific training establishment near Tadworth, Surrey (opened in 1984) to the Metropolitan Police's Dogs Training School in Keston, in the London Borough of Bromley. In May 2011, the Secretary of State for Transport Philip Hammond announced that British Transport Police would create an armed capability of its own with the added benefit of additional resilience and capacity to the overall UK police armed capability. BTP deploy armed patrols equipped with Glock 17 pistols, LMT AR-15 CQB carbines and tasers, alongside advanced trauma kits.

== Crime types ==
=== Route crime ===
Route crime collectively describes crimes and offences of trespass and vandalism which occur on railway lines and can affect the running of train services. The majority of deaths are due to suicide or trespass.

Graffiti costs rail firms over £5 million a year in direct costs alone. BTP maintains a graffiti database which holds over 1900 graffiti tags, each unique to an individual. In 2005 BTP sent 569 suspects to court (an increase of 16% on 2004 figures).

In the North West Area BTP has joined forces with Lancashire Constabulary and Network Rail to combat theft of metal items and equipment from railway lines in an initiative called Operation Tremor. BTP established Operation Drum in 2006 as a national response to the increase in metal theft offences and also chairs the relevant Association of Chief Police Officers working group.

=== Passenger crime ===
Operation Shield is an initiative by BTP to reduce the number of knives carried by passengers on the rail network. This initiative came about after knife crime began to rise and also because of the murder of a passenger on a Virgin CrossCountry service travelling from Glasgow.

In 2013, a survey conducted by TfL showed that 15% of women using public transport in London had been the subject of some form of unwanted sexual behaviour but that 90% of incidents went unreported. BTP, in conjunction with the Metropolitan Police Service, City of London Police and TfL, launched Project Guardian, which aimed to reduce sexual offences and increase reporting.

In November 2016, BTP introduced the "See It, Say It, Sorted" slogan in posters and on-train tannoy announcements, encouraging passengers to report suspicious activity. The slogan has gained wide recognition.

=== Hate crime ===
During the mid-2020s, BTP reported elevated levels of hate crime in London across public transport. Asked about hate crime on buses, Chief Superintendent Chris Casey of BTP told a City Hall meeting that international conflicts were “playing out” on London’s transport network. Police linked an increase in antisemitic incidents to the Israel–Gaza conflict that began in late 2023, as well as to the associated wave of pro-Palestinian protests in London. As part of its ongoing work, BTP has collaborated with the Metropolitan Police Service, TfL and other partners in a multi-agency effort to manage public protests, encourage the reporting of hate crime and support wider city-wide prevention strategies.

== Operational functioning and structure ==
As of April 2026, BTP served Great Britain with a workforce of 3,210 police officers, 1,656 police staff & designated officers, 214 police community support officers and 213 special constables.

=== Funding ===
The British Transport Police is almost wholly funded by the train operating companies, Network Rail and the London Underground – part of TfL. The majority of funding comes from the train operating companies. Other operators with whom BTP has a service agreement also contribute appropriately. This funding arrangement does not give the companies power to set objectives for BTP (these are set by the police authority), but there are multiple industry representatives serving as members of the police authority.

The force does not receive any direct funding from the Home Office, but may apply for grants – such as for special events, like the London 2012 Olympic Games. With BTP playing a large role in counter-terrorism on the rail network given increases in journeys, the force also sometimes receives grants towards operations, including from the Department for Transport.

The police authority set the budget for policing for 2026–27 at £445.2 million which is allocated as follows:

- A Division – £222.0M
- B Division (overground) – £53.0M
- B Division (underground) – £51.7M
- C Division – £58.4M
- D Division – £12.6M
- E Division – £44.5M
- BTPA – £3.0M

=== Force leadership ===
The current chief constable who has been in position since 2021 is Lucy D'Orsi. BTP was previously led by a chief police officer from its inception until 1958, after which it was led by a chief constable. The following people have served as chief constable:

- Arthur West (1958–1963)
- William Owen Gay (1963–1974)
- Eric Haslam (1974–1981)
- Kenneth Ogram (1981–1989)
- Desmond O'Brien (1989–1997)
- David Williams (1997–2001)
- Ian Johnston (2001–2009)
- Andrew Trotter (2009–2014)
- Paul Crowther (2014–2021)
- Lucy D'Orsi (2021–present)

=== Divisions ===
From 1 April 2014, the divisional structure changed from the previous seven division structure to one with a headquarters and four divisions. BTP stated that the new structure would 'deliver a more efficient force, generating savings to reinvest in more police officers across the railway network'.

The Force Headquarters/A Division is based at BTP headquarters in Victoria, London, this division retains overall control of the other divisions and houses central functions including forensics, CCTV and major investigations. As of 2015, 393 police officers, ten special constables and 946 police staff were based at FHQ.

B Division covers London and the South East and southern areas of England. As of 2015, it had 1,444 police officers, 101 special constables, 191 PCSOs and 361 police staff. It is divided into the following sub-divisions:

- North
- Central
- South

BTP Volvo XC60 at Paignton railway station.

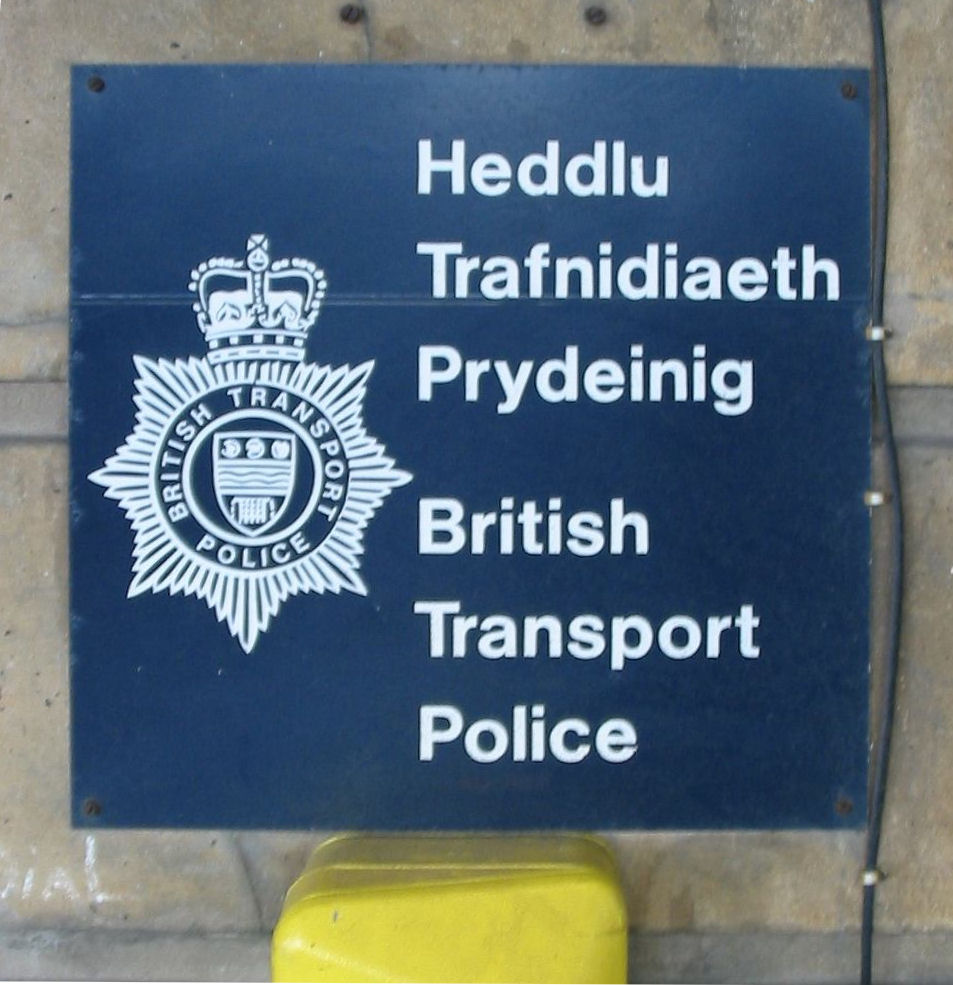
A bilingual sign in Welsh and English

C Division covers the North East, North West, the Midlands, South West areas of England and Wales. As of 2015, it had 921 police officers, 127 special constables, 132 PCSOs and 180 police staff. It is divided into the following sub-divisions:

- Pennine
- Midland
- Wales
- Western

D Division covers Scotland. There are no sub-divisions within D Division. As of 2015, D Division had 214 police officers, 24 special constables and 46 police staff.

E Division (Counter Terrorism) was formed in 2020, receiving the counter-terrorism units and assets from A Division. It was formerly known as Specialist Operations. E division comprises the force's specialist counter-terrorism units including the Firearms Unit, Dog Branch, Specialist Response Unit and others.

=== Communications and controls ===
BTP operates two force control rooms and one call-handling centre:

- First Contact Centre: Based in Birmingham and responsible for handling all routine telephone traffic. This facility was created following an inspection and recommendations by Her Majesty’s Inspectorate of Constabulary in 2008.
- Force Control Room – Birmingham: Based in Birmingham – alongside the First Contact Centre – and responsible for C and D Divisions which cover the East Midlands, West Midlands, Wales, the North West of England, the North East of England, the South West of England and Scotland.
- Force Control Room – London: Responsible for B Division which covers the South and East of England including Greater London (both TfL and Mainline).

BTP can be contacted for non-emergencies via their 61016 text service.

=== Custody suites ===
The force only acquired the power to designate custody suites in 2001, whereby all of the custody suites up until that point were non-designated and only allowed police to detain someone for six hours before they must have either been released (whether charged, bailed or released without charge) or transferred to a designated facility.

The force retains one designated custody suite that is operational at Brewery Road in London with 20 cells, where persons arrested within a reasonable travelling distance are taken, plus a temporary custody suite at Wembley Park that is used for some events. The force previously ran a number of other BTP custody suites in London and around the country but these were all closed by 2017 due to consolidation or concerns regarding the time that it took to transport prisoners there.

=== Specialist units ===
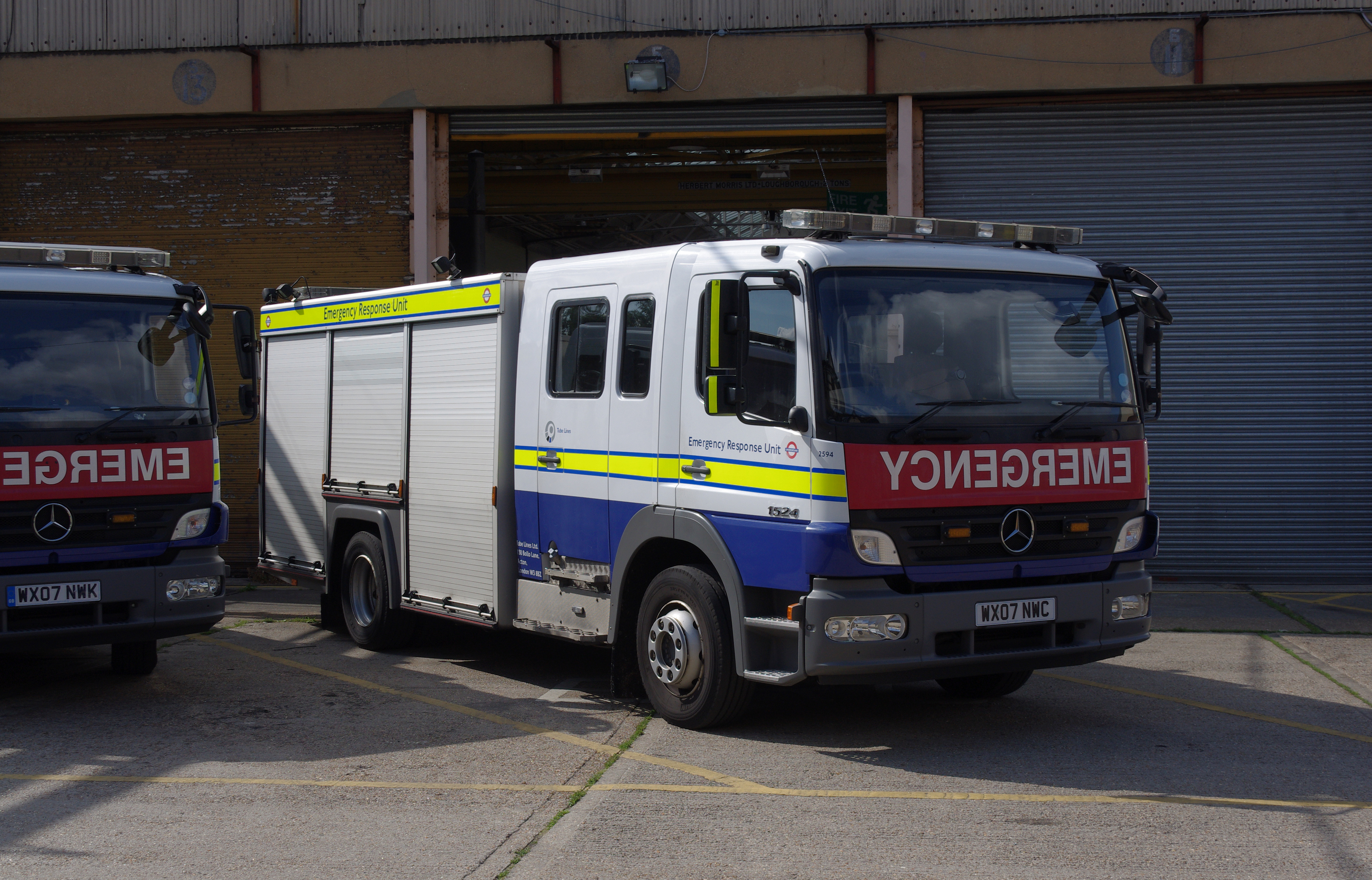
Prior to the implementation of blue lights and 'POLICE' livery, the vehicles were fitted with red and amber lights.

==== Emergency Response Unit ====
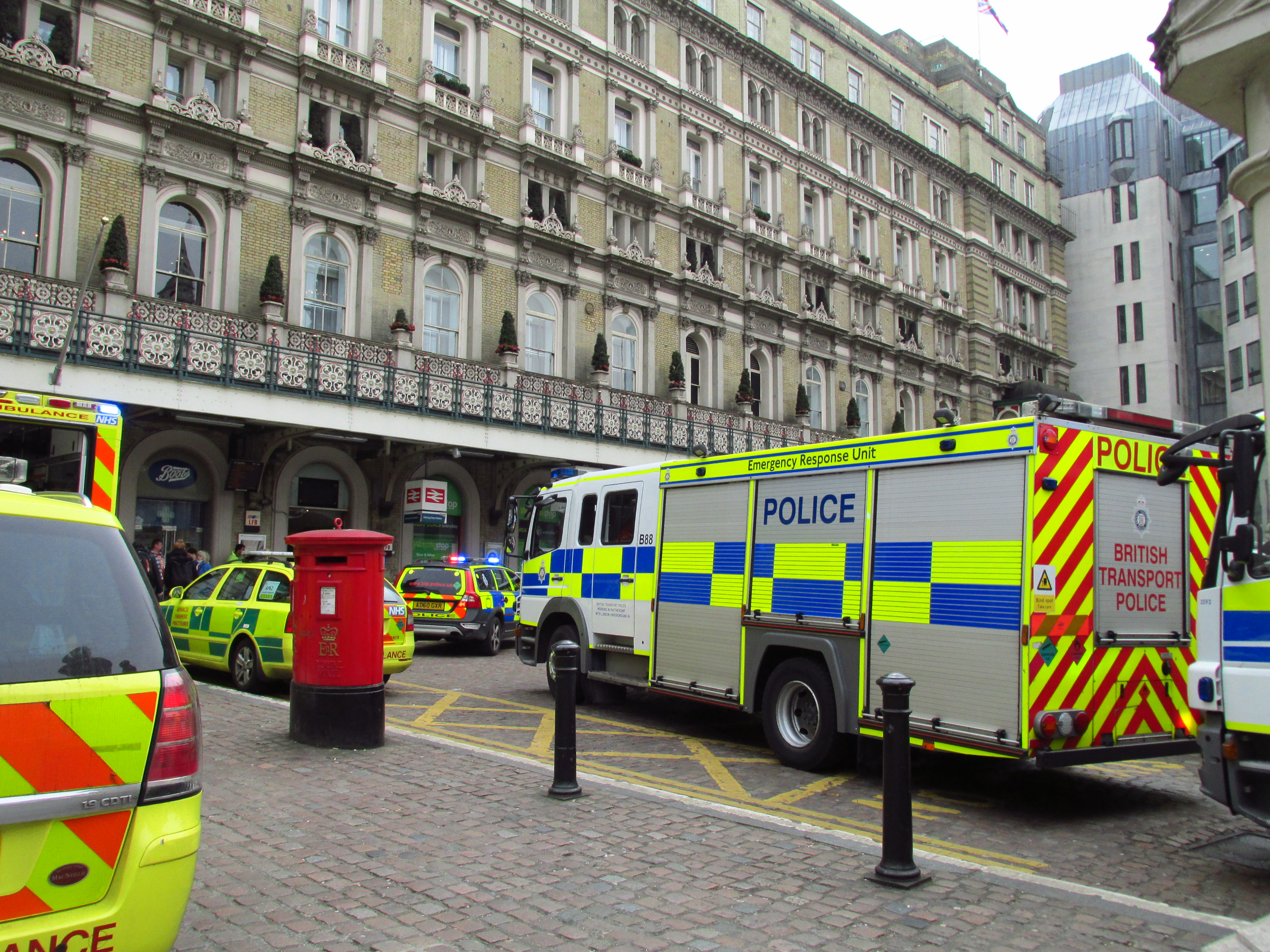
BTP ERU in police livery, on Scene of Security Alert

From 2012, as a result of a recommendation from the London Assembly Transport Committee following the 7 July 2005 London bombings, BTP embedded officers with TfL's Emergency Response Unit (ERU), which carries TfL engineers to incidents on the London Underground, such as one under accidents and terrorist incidents. ERU vehicles were also given blue lights and police markings, and driven by a BTP officer, to enable the unit to reach emergencies quicker and police to carry out necessary duties in relation to any crime or public safety issues. The use of the blue lights on the unit's vehicles was subject to the same criteria as with any other police vehicle.

Similar schemes have been implemented elsewhere in the country, including a partnership with Network Rail and South West Trains in which a BTP officer crews an "Emergency Intervention Unit", which conveys engineers and equipment to incidents on South West Train's network using blue lights. The scheme won the "passenger safety" category at the UK Rail Industry Awards in 2015. Another emergency response unit was established in partnership with Network Rail in the Glasgow area in the run-up to the 2014 Commonwealth Games.

==== Medic Response Unit ====
In May 2012, in addition to the support provided to TfL ERU vehicles, BTP formed the Medic Response Unit to respond to medical incidents on the London Underground network, primarily to reduce disruption to the network during the 2012 Summer Olympics. This was in response to TfL estimating that around one third of delays on the London Underground were caused by "passenger incidents", of which the majority related to medical problems with passengers. The purpose of the unit is to provide a faster response to medical incidents and passengers trapped in trains, providing treatment at the scene with the aim of reducing disruption to the network.

The scheme was initially for a 12-month trial and consisted of 20 police officers (18 police constables and two sergeants) and two dedicated fast-response cars. The officers attached to the unit each undertook a four-week course in pre-hospital care, funded by TfL. Its training and equipment is the same as that of the London Ambulance Service in order to ensure smooth hand-overs of patients. At the end of the trial period, in October 2013, the unit was reduced to eight officers; the other twelve returned to regular policing duties after TfL judged the results of the scheme to be less than conclusive. Officers from the unit treated over 650 people in the first year of operation, including rescuing a passenger who fell onto the tracks, and made 50 arrests. The unit remained operational as of June 2020.

==== Firearms unit ====
In May 2011, the Secretary of State for Transport announced with agreement from the Home Secretary that approval had been given for BTP to develop a firearms capability following a submission to government in December by BTP. Government stated that this was not in response to any specific threat and pointed out that it equipped BTP with a capability that was already available to other police forces and that BTP relied upon police forces for assistance which was a burden.

In February 2012, BTP firearms officers commenced patrols focusing on mainline stations in London and transport hubs to provide a visible deterrence and immediate armed response if necessary. Firearms officers carry a Glock 17 handgun and a LMT CQB 10.5" SBR carbine that may be fitted with a suppressor and are trained to armed response vehicle standard. (Note: The Firearms Unit whilst training firearms officers to Armed Response Vehicle (ARV) standard does not conduct ARV patrols; however, it uses vehicles to transport officers and tactical equipment to and from stations.)

In 2014, the Firearms Act 1968 was amended by the Anti-social Behaviour, Crime and Policing Act 2014 to recognise BTP as a police force under the Act in order to provide BTP a firearms licensing exemption the same as other police forces.

In December 2016, firearms officers commenced patrolling on board train services on the London Underground. In May 2017, as part of the response to the Manchester Arena bombing, it was announced that firearms officers would patrol on board trains outside London for the first time. In June 2017, BTP also announced that the force firearms capability would be expanding outside of London by establishing armouries and hubs at Birmingham and Manchester.

== Powers and status of officers ==
=== General powers ===
Under s.31 of the Railways and Transport Safety Act 2003, British Transport Police officers have "all the power and privileges of a constable" when:

- on track (any land or other property comprising the permanent way of any railway, taken together with the ballast, sleepers and rails laid thereon, whether or not the land or other property is also used for other purposes, any level crossings, bridges, viaducts, tunnels, culverts, retaining walls, or other structures used or to be used for the support of, or otherwise in connection with, track; and any walls, fences or other structures bounding the railway or bounding any adjacent or adjoining property)
- on network (a railway line, or installations associated with a railway line)
- in a station (any land or other property which consists of premises used as, or for the purposes of, or otherwise in connection with, a railway passenger station or railway passenger terminal (including any approaches, forecourt, cycle store or car park), whether or not the land or other property is, or the premises are, also used for other purposes)
- in a light maintenance depot,
- on other land used for purposes of or in relation to a railway, the transport police
- on other land in which a person who provides railway services has a freehold or leasehold interest
- throughout Great Britain for a purpose connected to a railway or to anything occurring on or in relation to a railway.

"Railway" means a system of transport employing parallel rails which provide support and guidance for vehicles carried on flanged wheels and form a track which either is of a gauge of at least 350 millimetres or crosses a carriageway (whether or not on the same level).

A BTP constable may enter parts of the railway network without a warrant, using reasonable force if necessary and whether or not an offence has been committed.

BTP officers derive their powers to police the London Cable Car from the London Cable Car Order 2012.

=== Outside natural jurisdiction ===
BTP officers need, however, to move between railway sites and often have a presence in city centres. Consequently, they can be called upon to intervene in incidents outside their natural jurisdiction. ACPO (now the NPCC) estimate that some 8,000 such incidents occur every year. As a result of the Anti-terrorism, Crime and Security Act 2001 BTP officers can act as police constables outside their normal jurisdiction in the following circumstances:

If requested by a constable of:

- a territorial police force,
- the Ministry of Defence Police (MDP), or
- the Civil Nuclear Constabulary (CNC)

to help assist an officer in the execution of their duties in relation to a particular incident, investigation or operation, a BTP constable also has the powers of the requesting officer for the purposes of that incident, investigation or operation. If a constable from a territorial police force makes the request, then the powers of a BTP constable extend only to the requesting constable's police area. If a constable from the MDP or CNC makes the request, then the powers of a BTP officer are the same as those of a requesting constable.

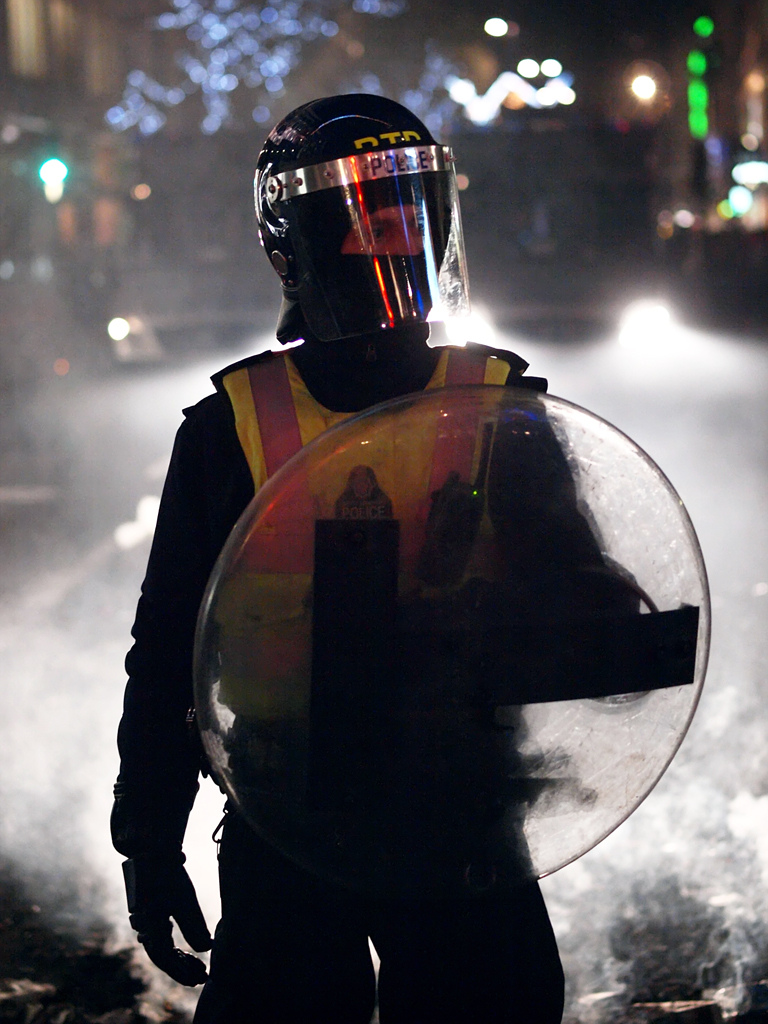
BTP police constable in riot gear aiding the Metropolitan Police in London during student protests, 9 December 2010

If requested by the chief constable of one of the forces mentioned above, a BTP constable takes on all the powers and privileges of members of the requesting force. This power is used for planned operations, such as the 2005 G8 summit at Gleneagles.

A BTP constable has the same powers and privileges of a constable of a territorial police force:

- in relation to people whom they suspect on reasonable grounds of having committed, being in the course of committing or being about to commit an offence, or
- if they believe on reasonable grounds that they need those powers and privileges in order to save life or to prevent or minimise personal injury or damage to property.

A BTP constable may only use such powers if they reasonably believe that waiting for a local constable (as above) would frustrate or seriously prejudice the purpose of exercising them.

The policing protocol between BTP and Home Office forces set outs the practical use of these extended powers.

==== Channel Tunnel Act 1987 ====
When policing the Channel Tunnel, BTP constables have the same powers and privileges as members of Kent Police when in France, and will also be under the direction and control of the chief constable of Kent.

==== Criminal Justice and Public Order Act 1994 ====
A BTP constable can:

- When in Scotland, execute an arrest warrant, warrant of commitment and a warrant to arrest a witness (from England, Wales or Northern Ireland), and
- When in England or Wales, execute a warrant for committal, a warrant to imprison (or to apprehend and imprison) and a warrant to arrest a witness (from Scotland).

When executing a warrant issued in Scotland, a BTP constable executing it shall have the same powers and duties, and the person arrested the same rights, as they would have had if execution had been in Scotland by a constable of Police Scotland. When executing a warrant issued in England, Wales or Northern Ireland, a constable may use reasonable force and has specified search powers provided by section 139 of the Criminal Justice and Public Order Act 1994.

==== Policing and Crime Act 2017 ====
A BTP constable, other than a special constable, can:

- When in Scotland, arrest an individual they suspect of committing a specified offence in England and Wales or Northern Ireland if the Constable is satisfied that it would not be in the best interests of justice to wait until a warrant has been issued under the Criminal Justice and Public Order Act 2004.
- When in England or Wales, arrest a person they suspect of committing a specified offence in Scotland or Northern Ireland, or the constable has reasonable grounds to believe that the arrest is necessary to allow the prompt and effective investigation of the offence or prevent the prosecution of the offence being hindered by the disappearance of the individual.

The power can be exercised on or off of transport property without restriction.

This is the only known power that is available to 'regular' BTP constables and not BTP special constables as a result of the Policing and Crime Act 2017 stating that the power is available to constables attested under Section 24 of the Railways and Transport Safety Act 2003 (BTP special constables are appointed under Section 25 of the aforementioned Act).

===== National and international maritime policing powers =====
BTP constables (both 'regular' and special constables) are designated as law enforcement officers in the same way as members of a territorial police force under Chapter 5 of the Act. This allows them to exercise maritime enforcement powers, including the powers of arrest for offences that could be subject to prosecution under the laws of England and Wales, Northern Ireland or Scotland, in relation to:

- a British ship in England and Wales, Northern Ireland or Scottish waters, foreign waters or international waters,
- a ship without nationality in England and Wales waters or international waters,
- a foreign ship in England and Wales waters or international waters, or
- a ship, registered under the law of a relevant territory, in England and Wales waters or international waters.

=== Attestation ===
BTP constables and special constables are required by sections 24 and 25 respectively of the Railways and Transport Safety Act 2003 to make an attestation, based on their jurisdiction (which are amended as appropriate for BTP from Schedule 4 of the Police Act 1996)

BTP constables are required to make the declaration required by section 10 of the Police and Fire Reform (Scotland) Act 2012 before a sheriff or justice of the peace.

=== Status off duty ===
Section 22 of the Infrastructure Act 2015 repealed section 100(3)(a) of the Anti-terrorism, Crime and Security Act 2001 which originally required BTP officers to be in uniform or in possession of documentary evidence (i.e. their warrant card) in order to exercise their powers. The repeal of this subsection, which came into effect on 12 April 2015, means BTP officers are able to use their powers on or off duty and in uniform or plain clothes regardless of whether they are in possession of their warrant card, subject to any other limitations placed on them under the Police and Criminal Evidence Act 1984.

=== Special constabulary ===
Under the terms of section 25 of the Railways and Transport Safety Act 2003 and section 100 of the Anti-terrorism, Crime and Security Act 2001, BTP special constables have identical jurisdiction and powers to regular BTP constables; primary jurisdiction on any railway in Great Britain and a conditional jurisdiction in any other police force area.

BTP special constables notably do not wear the standard 'SC' insignia (a crown with the letters SC underneath) on their epaulettes unlike some of their counterparts in some Home Office police forces. BTP special constables are able to apply to become a regular BTP constable but have to follow much the same recruitment process.

In January 2022 the British Transport Police Police Federation allowed BTP special constables to join, a precondition for an announcement in May 2022 that specials could be trained to carry tasers.

As of January 2024, the need to complete a promotion exam was removed, as well as two ranks, special superintendent and special chief inspector. It continues to be led by a special chief officer and a special deputy chief officer. BTP Special Constabulary's rank structure differs from the regular officers' structure, although some are similar. Special constables can progress up the rank structure and each division has a number of special inspectors and special sergeants who lead and manage their teams. Whilst the names may be similar to other ranks (e.g. inspector), the insignia is different, so that regulars and specials can be easily distinguished.

BTP special constables volunteer at least 16 hours per month, similar to Home Office forces. They also aim to reach Independent Patrol Status (IPS) and then, if so desired, can volunteer in different departments, including:

- Operational Support Unit (OSU)
- Criminal Investigation Department (CID) (including Major Serious and Organised Crime, MSOC)
- Civil Protection Unit
- Disruption Tasking Team
- Violent Crime Task Force.

For specials joining for England and Wales stations, training is completed in London; for Scottish specials it is in Glasgow. Phase One training is 26 days, in person, with additional online training sessions. A reduced training course is available for specials who transfer in from other police forces.

As of April 2026, BTP Special Constabulary had 213 special constables working across Great Britain.

== Police community support officers (PCSO) ==
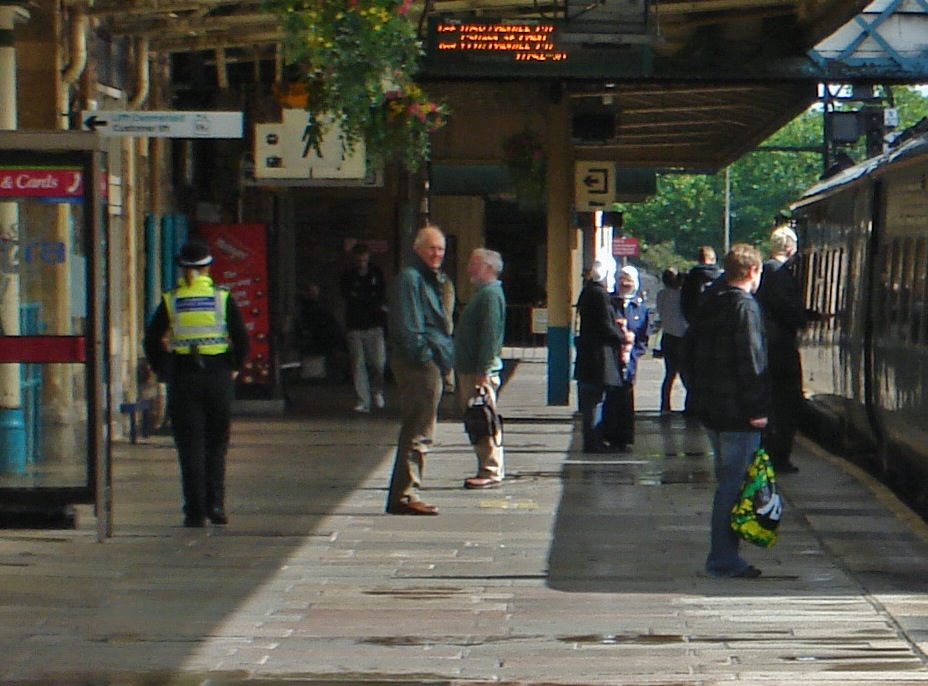
A PCSO of the British Transport Police on duty at Newport railway station, Wales

British Transport Police is the only special police force that employs police community support officers (PCSOs). Under Section 28 of the Railways and Transport Safety Act 2003, the BTP chief constable can recruit PCSOs and designate powers to them using the Police Reform Act 2002, which previously only extended to chief constables or commissioners of territorial police forces.

BTP started recruiting PCSOs on 13 December 2004. They were on patrol for the first time on Wednesday 5 January 2005, and mostly work in the force's neighbourhood policing teams (NPTs).

BTP is one of only three forces to issue its PCSOs handcuffs, the others North Wales Police and Dyfed-Powys Police. This also includes leg restraints. BTP PCSOs also utilise generally more powers than their counterparts in other forces.

Although BTP polices in Scotland (D Division) it does not have any PCSOs in Scotland due to the law that empowers PCSOs, the Police Reform Act 2002, not extending to Scotland. Although unlike police officers there is no formal transfer process. BTP is known to often attract PCSOs already serving in other police forces.

One of BTPs PCSOs is credited with making the force's largest ever illegal drugs seizure from one passenger when on 30 September 2009 PCSO Dan Sykes noticed passenger James Docherty acting suspiciously in Slough railway station only to find him in possession of £200,000 worth of Class C drugs. PCSO Sykes then detained Docherty who was then arrested and later imprisoned after trial.

In 2006 PCSO George Roach became the first BTP PCSO to be awarded a Chief Constable's Commendation after he saved a suicidal man from an oncoming train at Liverpool Lime Street railway station.

== Officer rank insignia ==
The rank structure for regular constables and PCSOs is as follows:

British Transport Police regular ranks and insignia
Rank	Chief constable (CC)	Deputy chief constable (DCC)	Assistant chief constable (ACC)	Chief superintendent	Superintendent	Chief inspector	Inspector	Sergeant	Constable	PCSO
Epaulette insignia										

The rank structure for special constables is as follows:

British Transport Police special ranks and insignia
Rank	Special chief officer	Special deputy chief officer	Special chief inspector (Not currently used)	Special inspector	Special sergeant	Special constable
Epaulette insignia						

== British Transport Police Authority ==
British Transport Police Authority

The British Transport Police Authority (BTPA) is the police authority that oversees BTP and provides accountability. The BTPA was created on 1 July 2004 and became the employer of BTP officers, taking over from the Strategic Rail Authority. The BTPA defines BTP strategic plans, maintains the force’s budget, allocates resources and makes senior appointments to the force to enable it to efficiently and effectively patrol the railways in England, Wales and Scotland. The BTPA chair is responsible for governance of the authority and is appointed by the Secretary of State for Transport. The current chair, Tricia Hayes, was appointed in March 2026. Previous position holders include:

- Alistair Graham from its founding in 2004 until the end of 2011
- Millie Banerjee from 2011 to 2015
- Esther McVey from 2015 to 2017
- Ron Barclay-Smith from 2018 to 2026.

== Proposed mergers and jurisdiction reforms ==
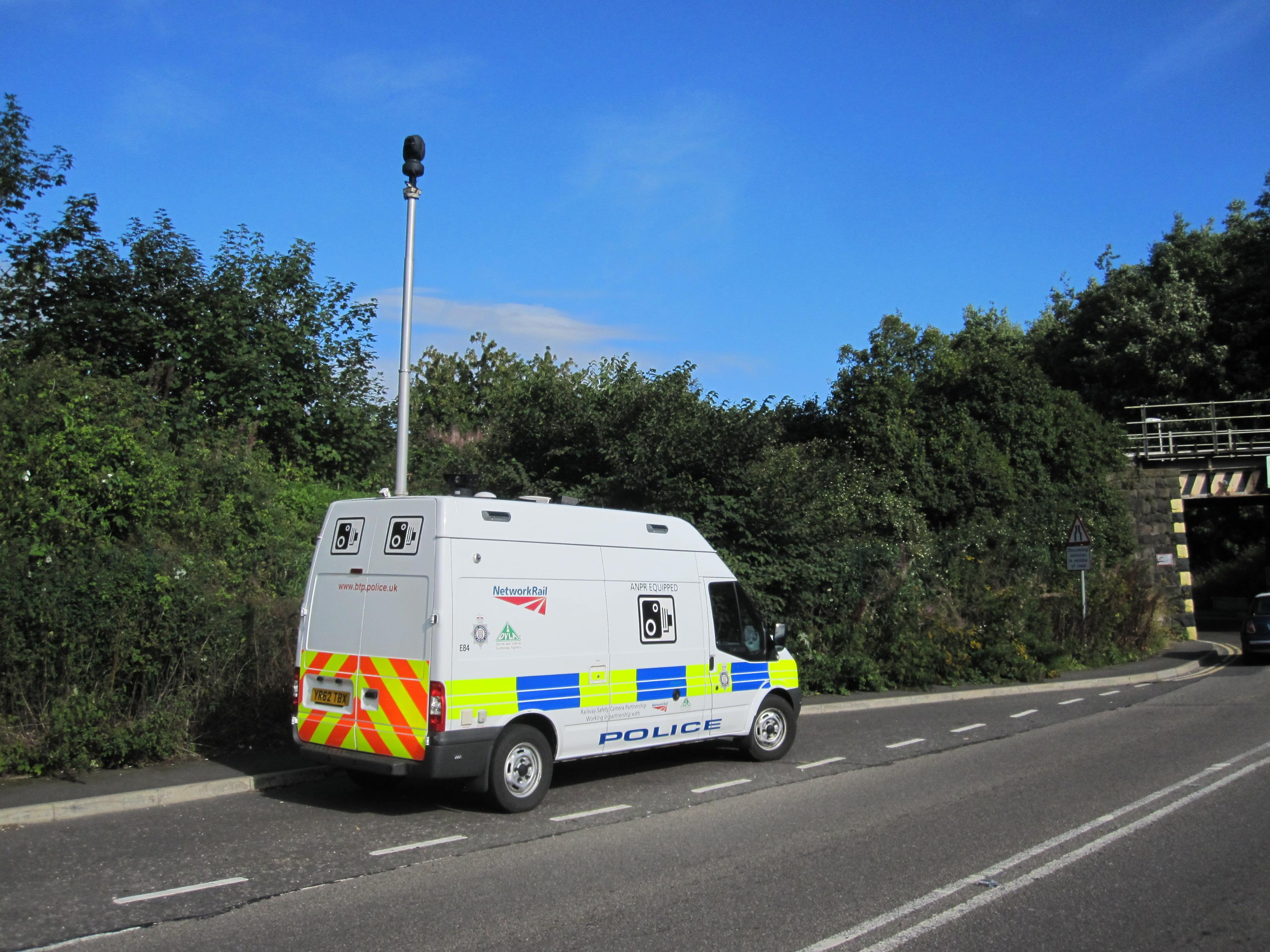
British Transport Police safety camera van, Millburn level crossing in Inverness

Although the British Transport Police is not under the control of the Home Office, and as such was not included as part of the proposed mergers of the Home Office forces of England and Wales in early 2006, both the then London mayor Ken Livingstone and then head of the Metropolitan Police Sir Ian Blair stated publicly that they wanted a single police force in Greater London. As part of this, they wished to have BTP functions within Greater London absorbed by the Metropolitan Police. However, following a review of BTP by the Department for Transport, no changes to the form and function of the force were implemented and any proposed merger did not happen.

There were Scottish government proposals for BTP's Scottish division (D Division) to be merged with Police Scotland. However, the merger was postponed indefinitely in August 2018.

In 2007, David Hamilton MP suggested in parliament that BTP take on airport policing nationally.

In 2010, it was suggested that BTP take on Vehicle and Operator Services Agency traffic officers and Highways England traffic officers. It was estimated BTP would save £25 million if this went ahead.

Around 2017 the government made a manifesto commitment to merge BTP, the Civil Nuclear Constabulary and Ministry of Defence Police into a single "British Infrastructure Police". This followed the January 2015 Île-de-France attacks which led to the then government to explore whether fully arming BTP and merging the three forces could create a significant increase in firearms officers in the UK such that they could act as a nationwide counter terrorism force. Two options for this were put forward but ultimately not taken forward:

Option 1: A single National Infrastructure Constabulary combining the function of the Civil Nuclear Constabulary, the Ministry of Defence Police, the British Transport Police, the Highways England Traffic Officer Service, DVSA uniformed enforcement officers and Home Office police forces' airport and port police units, along with private port police; or

Option 2: A Transport Infrastructure Constabulary and an Armed Infrastructure Constabulary, with the first bringing together the functions carried out by BTP, the Highways England Traffic Officer Service, DVSA uniformed enforcement officers and Home Office police forces' airport and port police units, along with private port police. The Armed Infrastructure force would be a merger of MDP and CNC.

== See also ==
- List of police forces of the United Kingdom
- Policing in the United Kingdom
- Transit police
- Railroad police
