= Derek Ridgewell =

Scottish police officer and criminal (1945–1982)

- Born: 9 May 1945; King's Park, Glasgow, Scotland
- Died: 31 December 1982 (aged 37); HMP Ford, West Sussex, England
- Occupation: Police officer
- Years active: 1964–1978
- Organization: British Transport Police
- Known for: Systematically framing people for crimes not committed
- Status: Deceased
- Conviction: Conspiracy to rob
- Penalty: 7 years imprisonment

Derek Arnold Ridgewell (9 May 1945 – 31 December 1982) was an officer in the British Transport Police (BTP) who was involved in a series of arrests, trials and imprisonments in which it was later found that he had framed innocent people.

== Early life ==
Derek Ridgewell was born on 9 May 1945 in King's Park, Glasgow, the son of a civil engineer and a housewife. When he was seven, his family moved to Bromley in southeast London. In 1964, at age 19, he joined the BTP. In 1966, he was transferred to its Criminal Investigation Department (CID) at the Bricklayers Arms goods depot in South London, where he worked as a dog handler. In 1968, Ridgewell was transferred to the BTP Headquarters CID, where his manager was Detective Inspector Maurice Woodman, who had also worked at the Bricklayers’ Arms depot and was best man at Ridgewell’s wedding. In 1971, Ridgewell was promoted to Detective Sergeant and posted to Baker Street. Here, he established a new ‘anti-mugging squad’.

== Wrongful arrests and wrongful convictions ==
Ridgewell and his squad worked in plain clothes. His customary behaviour was to confront young (usually black) men and accuse them of robbing people. If they resisted arrest, he would assault them. He then made up false confessions and testified against them.

=== Waterloo Four ===
Ridgewell and his team first employed his methods against four black men on a tube train in Waterloo station. In late 1971, they were arrested and charged with loitering with intent to commit an arrestable offence, and signed confessions. One of the defendants stated that he put his name to the confession because he feared being assaulted. The defendants, and the girlfriend of one of them who had been traveling on the same train, said that the police's account had been fabricated. In February 1972, the charges were dismissed by a magistrate, who sharply criticized Ridgewell's evidence. The confessions were sent to BTP headquarters so it could investigate the defendants’ allegation that the confessions had been obtained through violence.

=== Wayne Green and Andrew Sam ===
On 14 January 1972, plain-clothes BTP officers arrested Wayne Green and Andrew Sam at Tottenham Court Road tube station. The two men were subsequently convicted of attempted theft and sentenced to imprisonment for three months after Ridgewell gave evidence against them. On appeal their sentences were reduced to three years' probation.

In 2026, the Criminal Cases Review Commission (CCRC) referred Green and Sam's case to the Court of Appeal, citing Ridgewell's involvement in the case as reason to believe that the convictions would not be upheld.

=== Stockwell Six ===
Ridgewell was put in charge of a special patrol set up to target thefts on the Northern Line, which includes the Stockwell tube station. As the prosecution reported, on February 18, 1972, Ridgewell got into an empty carriage at Stockwell Station and was followed by 'the gang', whose 'leader’ threatened him with a knife and demanded money. The gang closed in and, it was alleged, Ridgewell was punched in the face. Ridgewell said he signalled to fellow officers waiting in the next carriage. A fight ensued and the teenagers were arrested. At trial the following September, the only witnesses were police officers. Five of the six defendants—Ronald De Souza, Paul Green, Courtney Harriot, Cleveland Davison and Texo Johnson–were found guilty of a variety of charges, ranging from ‘attempting to rob’ to ‘assault with intent to rob’ and were sentenced to between six months in borstal and three years in prison. The sixth young man was released–it was found that he could not read and so could not have understood the confession he signed.

In 2021, the case was referred by the CCRC to the Court of Appeal, and the convictions of Green, Harriott, Davison and Johnson, were overturned. It took some time to located De Souza; his conviction was overturned in July 2025.

=== Oval Four ===
On March 16, 1972, Winston Trew, Sterling Christie, George Griffiths and Constantine "Omar" Boucher, were arrested by Ridgewell's team. The men were members of the Fasimbas, a South London black political organisation. The prosecution's case was that police "saw the four accused hanging around and it was clear that they intended to pick the pockets of passengers". The four men initially believed they were being mugged, as the officers were in plain clothes and did not identify themselves as police. They were held overnight and said that they were beaten and forced to sign confessions to a series of thefts.

At trial, it was noted that no stolen property was found on any of the accused. The only witnesses for the prosecution were the arresting officers, no victims were named in the charges, and Diane O'Connor, a defence witness who saw the police initiate the attacks on the defendants and attempted to intervene, was charged with assault. The judge directed the jury to consider carefully whether "these statements are really fiction made up by Detective Sergeant Ridgewell" and he instructed the jury not to give verdicts on the charge of conspiracy to rob and to steal. The charges that they had supposedly confessed to, relating to a series of thefts of handbags and purses around markets and Tube stations in Central London, were not sustained.

On November 8, 1972, the four men were convicted of assaulting a police officer and attempted theft; Christie was also convicted of stealing a female police officer’s handbag. The youngest was sentenced to borstal, the other three to two years in prison. Following an appeal led by John Platts-Mills QC, their sentences were reduced to eight months, although the convictions were upheld, and Lord Justice Haymes commented that the reduction did not ameliorate the seriousness of their crimes.

After his release, Trew continued to protest his innocence and made a formal complaint to the police. He wrote a book, Black for a Cause…Not Just Because…, which he published in 2010. In the course of its investigation into the Stephen Simmons matter, the Criminal Cases Review Commission contacted Trew and the other members of the Oval Four. After reviewing their convictions, the CCRC referred the matter to the Court of Appeal, on the basis of evidence concerning Ridgewell's integrity, his conviction, the Simmons appeal and the other cases. In 2019 and 2020, all four sets of convictions were overturned by the Court of Appeal. In 2021, the members of the Oval Four received a formal apology from the BTP.

=== Tottenham Court Road Two ===
In mid-1972, at Tottenham Court station, Ridgewell arrested two young black Rhodesian men, Jesuits on their way to a social work course at Oxford University. At their trial in January 1973, the judge found Ridgewell's testimony to be so outlandish that he halted the trial. When asked by the defence counsel whether he had been "particularly on the lookout for coloured young men", Ridgewell agreed that this was the case. By this time, his actions had attracted media attention, with the BBC Television programme Nationwide and The Sunday Times reporting a calypso song being performed in Brixton pubs which declared that "If the muggers don’t get you, Ridgewell will". The National Council for Civil Liberties asked the Home Secretary to order an investigation.

There was no investigation, and Ridgewell faced no disciplinary action from the BTP. In January 1973, he was transferred from Baker Street to BTP Force Headquarters, and in September 1974 he was sent to BTP Waterloo. His anti-mugging squad was disbanded, and he was assigned to lead a team investigating mail theft.

=== Stephen Simmons ===
In June 1975, three young white men, including 20 year-old Stephen Simmons, were in a car in Clapham when they were pulled over by Ridgewell and two other officers, who arrested them in connection with stolen mailbags. At trial, all three pleaded not guilty, but were convicted. Simmons was sent to Borstal in Hollesley Bay to serve eight months. He lost his job, car and flat, and subsequently suffered from chronic ill health. One of his co-defendants later became an alcoholic and died.

In 2013, Simmons was listening to a radio programme about legal matters in which a barrister answered questions. Simmons called the programme to ask about his situation; the barrister suggested he make a Google search for the name of his arresting officer, which revealed Ridgewell's conviction. Simmons took his case to the CCRC. That led to a 2018 appeal, and his conviction was overturned. It also emerged in court that Ridgewell had been responsible for several cases in which young black men were falsely accused of "mugging" on the London Underground.

In 2026 the CCRC announced that the conviction of one of Simmons' co-defendants, Christopher Poulter, would be referred to the Court of Appeal. Poulter's conviction was quashed in September 2026, as was that of the third defendant, Kevin Biggs, who had died in 2004.

=== Saliah Mehmet and Basil Peterkin ===
In November 1975, Ridgewell led an operation that resulted in twelve employees at the Bricklayers’ Arms depot being charged with conspiracy to steal. They were accused of ‘relabelling’ parcels and selling the contents. Again, there were complaints that Ridgewell's squad had forced confessions. A 1977 article in the BTP Journal article, likely written by Ridgewell, said that the shift the men worked on was a mix "of Nigerians and Turks. Normally the two minority groups operate a strict race barrier between themselves, but these worked closely together. DS Ridgewell shrewdly reasoned that it was a common criminal purpose rather than the pious hopes of the Race Relations Board that caused them to overcome their prejudices."

On April 5, 1977 eight depot employees were convicted after a trial at the Old Bailey, with each receiving a nine-month prison sentences.

In his first appeal in 1978, one of the convicted men, Basil Peterkin, described Ridgewell’s method: "The railway police searched my house on 16 November 1975 and found nothing. They arrested seven of my workmates on my shift on the same night and charged them. Then Wednesday night they asked me to come into their office, searched me and alleged to have found two labels on me. I did not have those labels on me. The only explanation I can give is that either the police put it there or a member of staff put it in my jacket while it was hanging in the cloakroom. If I was guilty of conspiracy to steal with these men, why would I be walking round with incriminating evidence on me at work just three days after they had been arrested and my house searched?"

Two of the men, Saliah Mehmet and Basil Peterkin, had their convictions posthumously quashed in January 2024.

In 2021, the BTP said that they had searched for potentially wrongful convictions linked to Ridgewell, but did not submit this case to the CCRC. The families of Basil Peterkin and Saliah Mehmet (who had been a police officer in his native Cyprus) called for the law to be changed so that all cases linked to corrupt officers are reviewed.

Henry Blaxland KC, the barrister representing another man on trial with Mehmet and Peterkin, Errol Campbell (who died in 2004), told the court it was dealing with victims of miscarriage of justice brought about by "state crime", and said that the case "throws a shadow over the administration of justice and led to loss of confidence not only in the police, but in the legal system as a whole." Campbell had his conviction posthumously quashed in July 2025.

== Conviction ==
In May 1978, Ridgewell was arrested after a tip-off from one of the men who had helped him sell the items he had stolen, using the same alleged method as the Bricklayers' Arms men. On January 22, 1980, the officers who had prosecuted the depot workers – Ridgewell, DC Douglas Ellis and DC Alan Keeling – were sentenced at the Old Bailey for conspiracy to steal goods valued at £364,000, the approximate quantity was 60 van-loads of parcels. Ridgewell, it was found, kept the proceeds in a safety deposit box and five bank accounts, including one in Zurich. He was sentenced to seven years, Ellis to six years and Keeling to two years. Maurice Woodman became a Superintendent before retiring; he died in 2013. Some sources have estimated that Ridgewell stole goods with a value of over £1 million (1980) (equivalent to £4.54 million or US$5.8 million in 2024)

The governor of HM Prison Ford asked Ridgewell why he had embarked on a life of crime. His reply was, "I just went bent". He died in prison in 1982, officially of a heart attack, at age 37.

== Official apology ==
In November 2021, Lucy D'Orsi, the British Transport Police chief constable, apologised to the black community in the United Kingdom "for the trauma suffered by the British African community through the criminal actions" of Ridgewell, adding that "In particular, it is of regret that we did not act sooner to end his criminalisation of British Africans, which led to the conviction of innocent people".

In July 2025, the BTP stated that it is conducting a review of files from the 1970s, looking for Ridgewell's possible partners-in-crime, and for additional victims. A previous review was eight pages long and investigators failed to interrogate retired officers thought to have colluded with Ridgewell. The BTP has stated that it now has "extra resources".
