= Barbara Gray (urban planner) =

Canadian urban planner

General Manager of Toronto Transportation Services
- In office December 8, 2016 – October 24, 2025
- Preceded by: Steve Buckley
- Succeeded by: Ashley Curtis (acting)

Personal details
- Born: 1966 (age 59–60) Manhattan, New York, U.S.
- Spouse: Alfred Silva (m. 2000)
- Children: 2
- Occupation: Municipal civil servant

Barbara Gray is an American-Canadian civil servant who was the general manager of Transportation Services at the City of Toronto from 2016 to 2025. Gray has been working as a municipal civil servant since 1999, first in Seattle, and since 2016 in Toronto. She is an advisory board member of the University of Toronto Transportation Research Institute. She is an expert in urban transportation and urban transit.

== Early life ==
Gray was born in Manhattan, before moving to New Jersey. She attended Lafayette College in Pennsylvania before moving to Seattle Washington to earn a graduate degree in Urban Planning at the University of Washington.

== Seattle Department of Transportation ==
Ben Spurr, writing in the Toronto Star, described Gray as an advocate of "Progressive transportation policies". He reported she was a defender of the rights of pedestrians and cyclists. Spurr wrote that Gray played a central role in getting the Seattle electorate to vote to support the Move Seattle levy, an additional tax Seattle taxpayers would pay to build improvements to Seattle public transportation infrastructure.

== Toronto Transportation Services ==
Gray was hired by the City of Toronto in 2016, beginning as general manager of Transportation Services on December 8.

Sue-Ann Levy, writing in the Toronto Sun, asserted that Gray was engaged in a "war on the car", in both Seattle and Toronto. In May 2017, CBC News reported that Gray had announced the retirement of four senior subordinates. IT Business magazine interviewed Gray in December 2017 about two traffic light systems, that relied on artificial intelligence, that Toronto was experimenting with. Toronto's current system uses car-sensing inductance loops, and fixed algorithms, to detect and modify light timing.

Gray retired as general manager in 2025, with her last day being October 24.
