= Operation Shield =

Operation Shield is an initiative led by British Transport Police, where security scanners are to be deployed at major railway stations with the aim of discouraging criminal activity on the rail network.

The trial of the portable equipment was undertaken by BTP in the London area and has been used in towns and cities such as Cardiff, Glasgow, Manchester, Preston, Blackpool, Leeds and Edinburgh.

The initiative came after the use of metal detectors at several London Underground (tube) stations led to 100 arrests and the seizure of 68 knives after around 10,000 passengers were checked.

Police resources include:

- uniformed and plainclothes police officers,
- sniffer dogs,
- mobile scanners.

These were deployed at stations where robbery was known to be a problem. As well as catching those carrying weapons, officers were able to spot individuals shying away from the detectors and made a number of arrests for other offences such as possession of drugs and stolen goods. The equipment is easily moved from one location to another making it ideal to target locations with an element of surprise.

• Operation Shield is separate to the Department for Transport's high-profile security scanning trial at Paddington Station which was set up as part of the response to the July 7 bombings.
