= HM Prison Ford =

Category D men's prison in West Sussex, England

HMP Ford
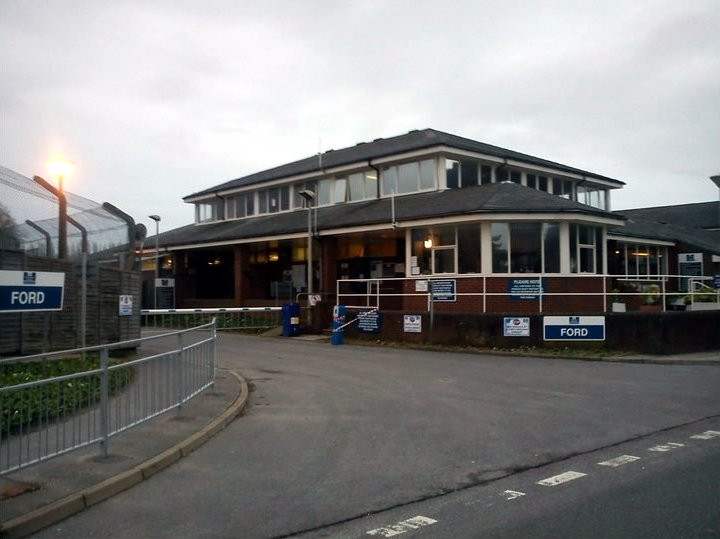
- HMP Ford Gatelodge
- Interactive map of HMP Ford
- Location: Ford, West Sussex; 50°48′58″N 00°34′46″W
- Security class: Adult Male/Category D
- Capacity: 521
- Opened: 1960
- Managed by: HM Prison Services
- Governor: Mark Drury
- Website: Ford at justice.gov.uk

HM Prison Ford (informally known as Ford Open Prison) is a Category D men's prison, located at Ford, in West Sussex, England, near Arundel and Littlehampton. The prison is operated by His Majesty's Prison Service.

== Air Force and Navy use ==
=== Beginnings ===
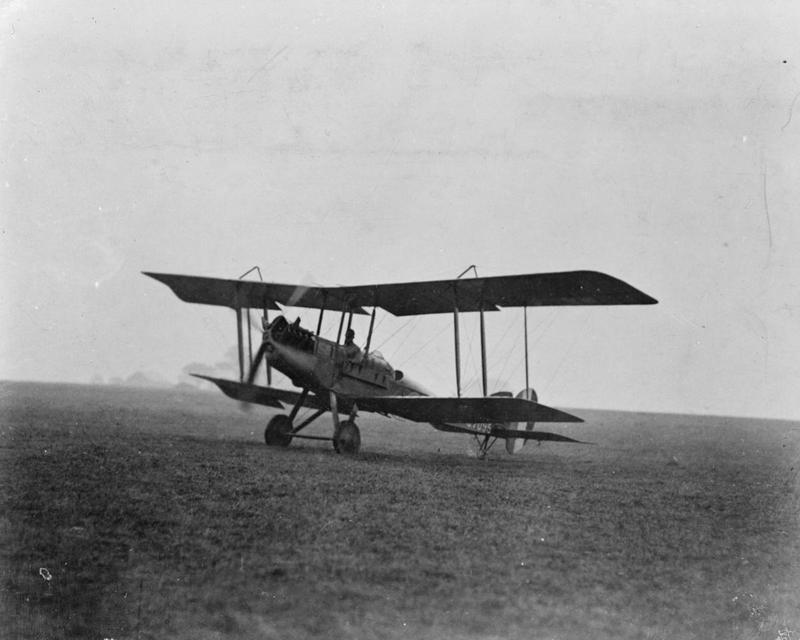
Landing in a Royal Aircraft Factory B.E.12 aircraft, Ford Aerodrome, Sussex, 1918

An 85 acres (34 ha) site adjacent to Yapton village was inaugurated as an airfield for the Royal Flying Corp (RFC) and subsequently the Royal Air Force (RAF) as well as the United States Army Air Service (USAAS) training squadrons in March 1918, and it became known as Ford Junction military aerodrome. In 1920, the airfield was closed, and it was not until 1933 that it reopened for civil flying. In 1936, the Air Ministry took ownership of the site, and in 1937, RAF Ford was reactivated.

=== HMS Peregrine (1939–1940) ===
On 24 May 1939, as part of the Fleet Air Arm moving to the Royal Navy, four airfields were transferred from the Air Ministry to the Admiralty: RAF Donibristle, RAF Lee-on-Solent, RAF Ford, and RAF Worthy Down, the airbase became known as Royal Naval Air Station Ford, (RNAS Ford) and commissioned as HMS Peregrine, with Captain(A) R.de H. Burton, RN, as the initial Royal Navy commanding officer of the airbase. The RN Observer School was formed out of the disbanded School of Naval Cooperation RAF at HMS Peregrine and its aircraft were allocated across three new Fleet Air Arm Squadrons which were also formed on that day.

=== RAF Ford (1940–1945) ===
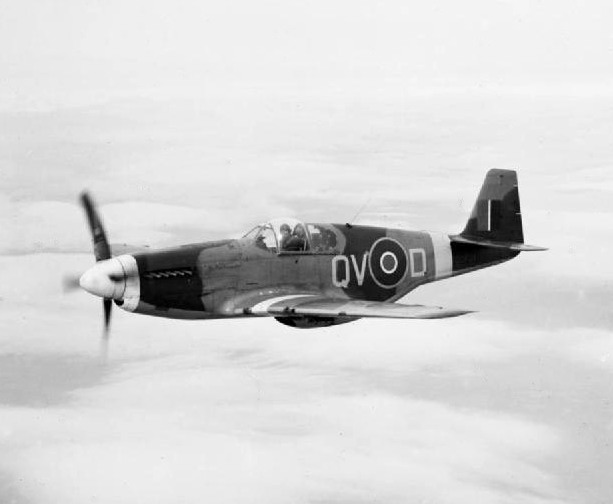
Royal Air Force North American Mustang III of No. 19 Squadron RAF based at Ford, 1944

The Air Ministry oversaw the development of the station during the war. In 1941, two tarmac runways were constructed, measuring 6,000 feet (1,800 m) in the southwest/northeast direction and 4,800 feet (1,500 m) in the northwest/southeast direction. Additionally, extensive new taxiways were established to the west of the original airfield. The construction included blast pens and several Blister hangars strategically placed around the perimeter track to complement the existing Bellman hangars.

=== Recommissioned as HMS Peregrine (1945–1948) ===
RNAS Ford was re-commissioned as HMS Peregrine in August 1945. At that point, 746 Naval Air Squadron, the Night Fighter Interception Unit, was still stationed here, however, it relocated to RAF West Raynham on the 23 of the same month. Additionally, on 1 August, the long-established RN Photographic Flight was elevated to squadron status, resulting in the formation of the 720 RN Photographic Squadron at this location.

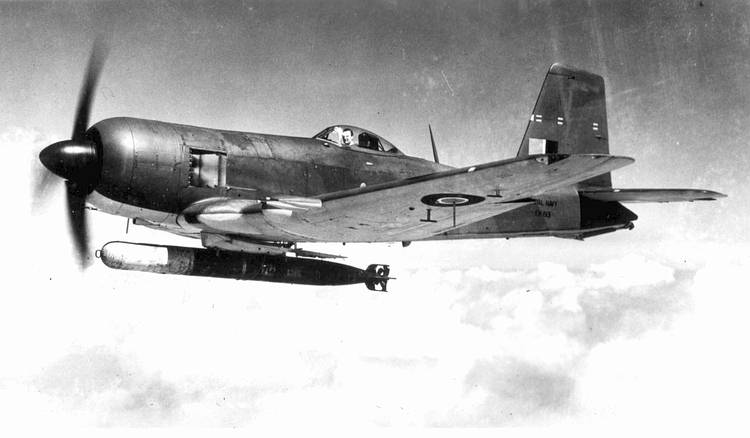
Blackburn Firebrand TF Mk. IV

On 1 September 813 Naval Air Squadron was reestablished as a Torpedo Strike Squadron, utilising Blackburn Firebrand TF.IV aircraft. Shortly thereafter, on 6 September, 708 Naval Air Squadron, designated as the Firebrand Tactical Trials Unit, arrived at the airbase from RNAS Gosport (HMS Siskin), equipped with Blackburn Firebrand TF.III. The commanding officer and several pilots from this unit became the core of 813 Naval Air Squadron, as they possessed the most extensive experience with the Firebrand, having previously addressed numerous issues associated with this aircraft model.

=== On the books of Daedalus (1948–1950) ===
HMS Peregrine was decommissioned on 30 June 1948, at which point its accounts were transferred to the records of HMS Daedalus, while a major refurbishment took place with operations under the supervision of Commander J.F.R. Crewes, GM, RN. The undertaken projects encompassed the resurfacing of runways and taxiways, the installation of a substantial concrete hard-standing, and the construction of three new hangars. Additionally, the technical and domestic areas underwent a thorough cleanup and partial reconstruction.

=== Third commission as HMS Peregrine (1950-1958) ===
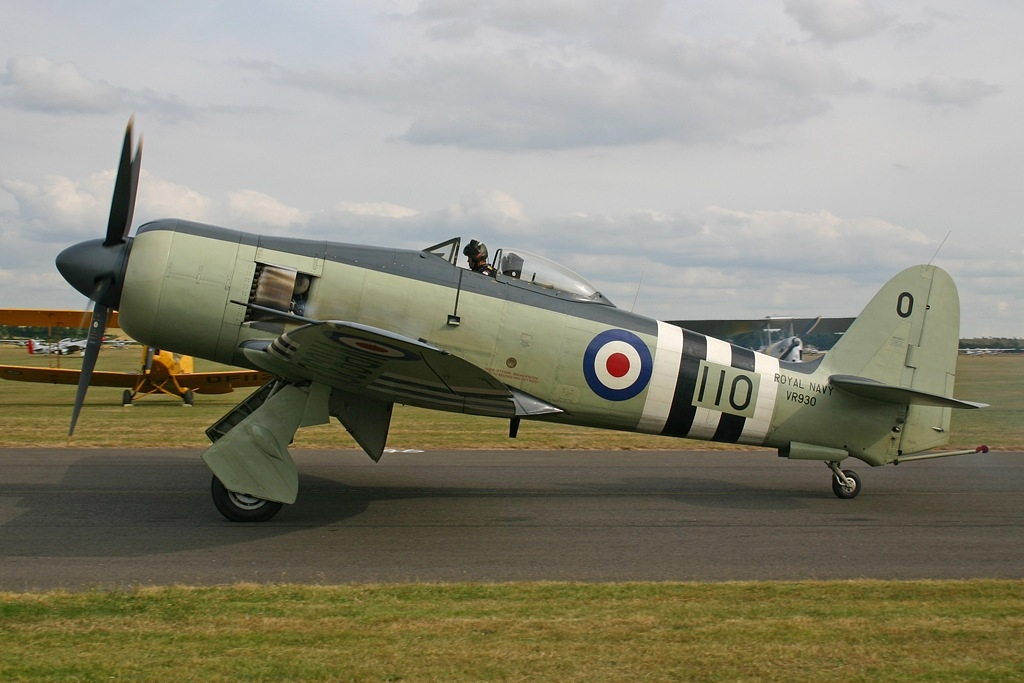
Hawker Sea Fury FB.11; and example of the type used by 807 Squadron

On 1 February 1950, RNAS Ford recommissioned as HMS Peregrine the commanding officer was Captain H.C.P. Sears, RN. Flying operations resumed the following month. The first unit to be based at the station was 703 Naval Air Squadron, a Service Trials Unit, which flew in on 19 April after relocating from RNAS Lee-on-Solent, it bought with it a representative range of front-line aircraft then in service.

== Prison recent history ==
The prison has been criticised for its lax security – especially after 70 people, including three murderers serving the last three years of their sentences, absconded in 2006 alone.

In March 2009, the prison's own Independent Monitoring Board issued a report stating that an outdated CCTV security system and a staffing shortage were contributing to burglars breaking into the jail to steal equipment from workshops. The report also found that drugs, alcohol and mobile phones were being smuggled into the prison for inmates. Two months later, an inspection report from His Majesty's Chief Inspector of Prisons found that inmates were leaving the prison complex at night to acquire alcohol. The report also stated that the prison was underperforming in preparing inmates for resettlement on release. In October 2009, an investigation was launched after it emerged that a prisoner at Ford had been able to remove documents from a disused office in the prison complex.

In July 2010, managers of Ford Prison had to apologise after Muslim prisoners at the jail were served burgers containing pork. 20 Muslim inmates were served the non-halal food before they noticed that the packaging for the burgers listed pork as an ingredient.

=== Notable former inmates ===
- Chris Atkins
- Andy Cunningham
- Derek Ridgewell
- Khalid Masood
- Gerald Ronson
- George Best
- Kenneth Halliwell
