= Lucy D'Orsi =

British police officer

Lucy D'Orsi CVO QPM
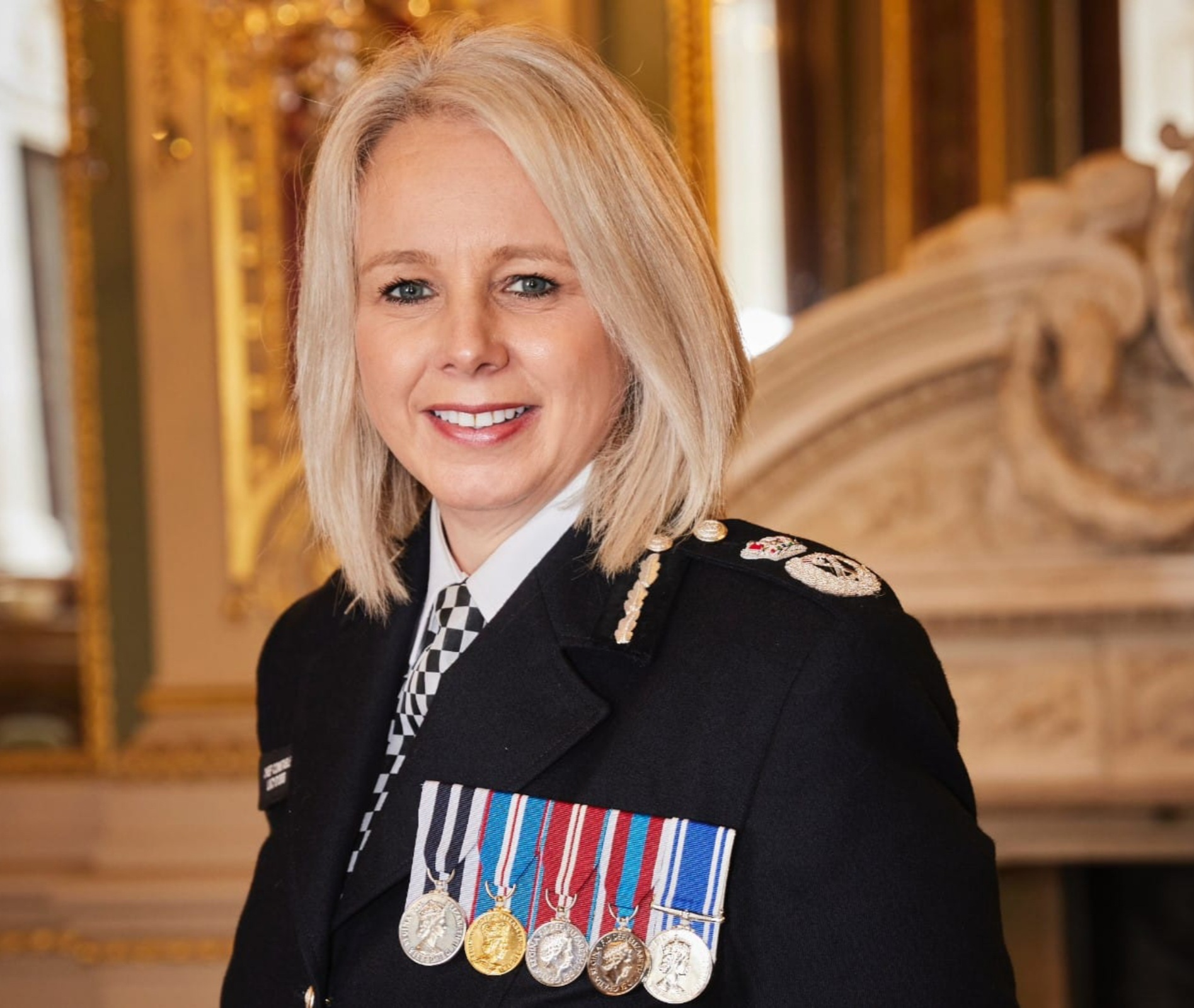
- British Transport Police Chief Constable

Chief Constable of British Transport Police
- Incumbent
- Assumed office March 2021
- Preceded by: Paul Crowther; Adrian Hanstock (Temporary Chief Constable, January 2021 to March 2021)

Deputy Assistant Commissioner Security and Protection Metropolitan Police
- In office December 2016 – February 2021
- Preceded by: Pat Gallan
- Succeeded by: Barbara Gray

Personal details
- Born: Lucy Clare Copson; December 1969 (age 56) Leicester, England
- Education: Sheffield Hallam University
- Profession: Police officer

Lucy Clare D'Orsi, CVO, QPM (née Copson; born December 1969) is a senior British police officer. Since March 2021, she has served as chief constable of British Transport Police (BTP). She was previously Deputy Assistant Commissioner in the Metropolitan Police Service, with responsibility for the Protection Command.

== Early life and family ==
Lucy D'Orsi was born Lucy Copson in Leicester, in December 1969. She grew up in the Borough of Charnwood and attended Rawlins College in Quorn, Leicestershire, attending the sixth form. Her parents were social workers, with her father being a divisional manager of social services for Leicestershire County Council.

She married Raffaele D'Orsi, from Merseyside, in Swithland in September 1993, when she was a police officer in London. Raffaele was a Detective Superintendent and Deputy Borough Commander for policing in the Royal Borough of Kensington and Chelsea. In 2004, Lucy and Raffaele D'Orsi were thanked by author Lynda La Plante for their advice on police procedures for her novel Above Suspicion.

== Career ==
D'Orsi joined the Metropolitan Police Service in 1992 working in central London Vine Street Station. She was in charge of the police response to London's largest fire of 2006, in Beaufort Park, Hendon, and has previously headed special operations relating to illegal weapons. She later moved from Enfield to take up the post of Chief Superintendent and Borough Commander in Hammersmith and Fulham from March 2011 to March 2014, after which she was promoted to Commander in East London.

In 2015, D'Orsi was in charge of security during the visit of Chinese leader Xi Jinping to the United Kingdom which was regarded on the British official side as a very difficult visit to arrange as in negotiations the Chinese delegation had wanted their security officials to be able to carry guns and for all anti-Chinese protests to be banned, neither of which demands were agreed to by the Metropolitan Police. However, during the visit, three protestors were arrested and their homes searched resulting in criticism that legitimate protests had been blocked and the response to the protests "heavy handed". In a blog post written in her official capacity in 2015, D'Orsi rejected accusations that the policing of protests during the visit had been subject to political interference, saying "The policing of the state visit was a matter for the Metropolitan Police Service and any other suggestion is wrong".

D'Orsi was recommended for a commendation for her work during the visit but did not receive it because her performance was seen as part of the natural duties of her role. In May 2016, Queen Elizabeth II was filmed remarking that it was "bad luck" for D'Orsi to be responsible for security during the visit given the challenges and that the Chinese "were very rude to the ambassador".

In 2016, she was appointed Deputy Assistant Commissioner for the force's Protection Command. D'Orsi has also been responsible for policing operations for London’s new year’s eve, the state visit of the then President Trump and the NATO Summit (2019).

On 3 December 2020, the British Transport Police Authority announced that D'Orsi would be the next Chief Constable (CC) of the British Transport Police, taking over the role from February 2021. She is also the current national police lead for taser and counter drone UK capabilities.

As CC of the BTP, D’Orsi is also part of the NPCC and is the lead for Taser and Counter Drone UK capabilities.

D'Orsi was awarded the Queen's Police Medal (QPM) in the 2021 Birthday Honours.

In 2022, as part of Operation London Bridge D'Orsi was appointed the national police lead and Gold Commander for the funeral of Elizabeth II. In 2023, she was appointed a Commander of the Royal Victorian Order (CVO) in the 2023 Demise Honours.

Since taking over as Chief Constable of the BTP, D’Orsi has led on a programme of modernisation.

== Honours ==

| Ribbon | Description | Notes |
| | Royal Victorian Order (CVO) | Commander; 2023 Demise Honours; "for services to the Lying-in-State of Her Majesty Queen Elizabeth II". |
| | Queen's Police Medal (QPM) | 2021 Birthday Honours; For Distinguished Service |
| | Queen Elizabeth II Golden Jubilee Medal | 2002; UK Version of this Medal |
| | Queen Elizabeth II Diamond Jubilee Medal | 2012; UK Version of this Medal |
| | Queen Elizabeth II Platinum Jubilee Medal | 2022; UK Version of this Medal |
| | King Charles III Coronation Medal | 2023; UK Version of this Medal |
| | Police Long Service and Good Conduct Medal | With 30 years service clasp |

Police appointments
| Preceded by Paul Crowther | Chief Constable of British Transport Police; 2021–Current | Incumbent |
