= Kathleen Folbigg =

Australian exoneree (born 1967)

- Born: Kathleen Megan Britton; 14 June 1967 (age 59); Balmain, Sydney, Australia
- Known for: Wrongly accused of murdering her own children
- Children: 4

Kathleen Megan Folbigg (née Britton; born 14 June 1967) is an Australian woman who was wrongfully convicted in 2003 of murdering her four infant children. She was pardoned in 2023 after 20 years in jail following a long campaign for justice by her supporters, and had her convictions overturned on appeal a few months later.

No direct evidence of the alleged crimes was ever found, but in the personal diary discovered by her husband and handed over to the police, several entries seemed to suggest she might have harmed, and indeed murdered, her children. She was arrested in 2001 and convicted in 2003, sentenced to 40 years with a non-parole period of 30 years. Folbigg maintained her innocence, however, saying the four children had died from natural causes.

Scientific and medical research suggesting the daughters might indeed have died of natural causes was rejected by a judicial inquiry in 2019. Subsequent research published in 2020 led ninety eminent Australian scientists and medical professionals, in March 2021, to petition the NSW Governor to pardon Folbigg. The petition succinctly demonstrated that all four deaths could be explained as the effects of very rare genetic factors. On 5 June 2023, Folbigg was unconditionally pardoned by NSW Governor Margaret Beazley and was released from prison.

== Early life ==
Kathleen Britton was born on 14 June 1967 in Sydney. On 8 January 1969, her biological father, Thomas John "Taffy" Britton, murdered her mother, Kathleen Mary Donovan, by stabbing her 24 times. Kathleen was 18 months old. Her father was arrested the day after the murder, and served 15 years in prison for murder before being deported to England. Folbigg was made a ward of the state and placed into foster care with a couple. On 18 July 1970, she was removed from their care and placed into Bidura Children's Home. Two months later, Folbigg moved into a permanent foster care placement. Here she also met her foster sister, Lea Bown. This arrangement lasted until she was a young adult. She left school at the age of seventeen, and married Craig Gibson Folbigg in 1987, a marriage that was to end in divorce in 2005.

== Deaths ==
The Folbigg couple had four children; one child after another died in early infancy.

=== Caleb Gibson ===
Caleb Gibson Folbigg, born on 1 February 1989, was known to breathe noisily and was diagnosed by a paediatrician to be suffering from a mild case of laryngomalacia, something he would eventually outgrow; he was otherwise born healthy. On 20 February, Caleb died in his sleep, in a room adjoining his parents' bedroom. During the night, Caleb stirred from midnight until 2 am. Found by Folbigg, the death was attributed to sudden infant death syndrome (SIDS). Caleb was 19 days old.

=== Patrick Allen ===
Patrick Allen Folbigg was born on 3 June 1990. Craig remained at home to help care for his wife and baby for three months after the birth. On 18 October, Folbigg put Patrick to bed. Craig was awakened by the sounds of his wife screaming and found her standing at the baby's cot. He noticed the child was not breathing and attempted to revive him by cardiopulmonary resuscitation. An ambulance was called and Patrick was taken to hospital. He would later be diagnosed to be suffering from epilepsy and cortical blindness, though the apparent life-threatening event would go unexplained. He died four months later (February 13, 1991) due to seizures. On 18 February 1991, Folbigg telephoned her husband at work to report Patrick's death, saying "It's happened again!"

=== Sarah Kathleen ===
Following their second loss, the couple moved to Thornton, New South Wales, a suburb of Maitland. Sarah Kathleen Folbigg was born on 14 October 1992, and died on 29 August 1993, aged 10 months.

=== Laura Elizabeth ===
In 1996, the couple moved to Singleton. On 7 August 1997, Laura Elizabeth Folbigg was born. On 27 February 1999, Laura died, at the age of 18 months.

== Justice system ==
=== Trial ===
In 1999, Kathleen Folbigg had been incriminated by her own husband, but it was not until April 2001 that she was arrested.

Folbigg's trial lasted seven weeks in 2003. The prosecution alleged Folbigg murdered her four children by smothering them during periods of frustration. Their case relied on the improbability of all four children dying of natural causes, citing the now-dubious Meadow's law, a maxim attributed to British paediatrician Roy Meadow: "One sudden infant death is a tragedy, two is suspicious and three is murder, until proven otherwise."

During a jury replay of Folbigg's police interview, she attempted to run from the courtroom.

The defence made the case that Folbigg did not kill or harm her children and that she did not think that Craig was responsible either. Although prosecution witnesses were concerned about the lack of prodromal (early-warning) symptoms in any of the children, the defence posed natural explanations for the events such as cot death and, in the case of Laura's death, myocarditis. The defence highlighted that Folbigg was a caring mother, pointing to journal entries that showed the care and concern that she gave her children. Some of her acquaintances gave statements to investigators about her caring nature.

The defence pointed out that there were no direct admissions to the killings in Folbigg's journal entries, and that any entries indirectly suggesting her responsibility could be chalked up to a typical grieving mother's guilt. Folbigg appeared genuinely distraught to ambulance and police responders to the scene. They pointed out that no physical evidence could link Folbigg to murder; it was an entirely circumstantial case with very little consensus among the scientific experts who testified at trial.

=== Verdict ===
On 21 May 2003, Folbigg was found guilty by the Supreme Court of New South Wales jury of three counts of murder, one count of manslaughter and one count of maliciously inflicting grievous bodily harm. On 24 October 2003, Folbigg was sentenced to forty years' imprisonment with a non-parole period of thirty years.

=== Appeal ===
On 17 February 2005, the court reduced her sentence to thirty years' imprisonment with a non-parole period of twenty-five years on appeal. Due to the nature of her purported crimes, Folbigg resided in protective custody to prevent possible violence by other inmates. Nevertheless, after a transfer of prisons, Folbigg was savagely beaten by another inmate on 1 January 2021.

=== Judicial inquiry ===
In 2011, an Australian legal academic, Emma Cunliffe, published a book titled Murder, Medicine and Motherhood in which she argued that Kathleen Folbigg had been wrongfully convicted on the basis of misleading medical evidence and unduly prejudicial interpretations of Ms. Folbigg's diaries. This book and its conclusions received considerable media attention.

In 2013, a team of lawyers in Newcastle, where the Folbiggs had lived, took on her case. They enlisted several medical experts, including Stephen Cordner, a renowned forensic pathologist at Melbourne's Monash University, whose 121-page report argued that Sarah's death appeared to be an almost textbook example of sudden infant death syndrome or SIDS, and that Caleb's floppy larynx, Patrick's severe seizures and Laura's myocarditis more strongly supported death by natural causes than did smothering, for which no evidence existed. Regarding the expert testimony from 2003, he stated, "In my view, it is wrong to rely on the forensic pathology evidence provided in this case to support the conclusion that one or more of the Folbigg children are the victims of a homicide. There is no merit in forcing certainty where uncertainty exists. The very existence of the enigma of SIDS demonstrates how little we know about why some babies die."

In June 2015, Folbigg's legal team delivered an official petition, including Cordner's report, to the Attorney-General's office in Sydney.

Three years later, on 22 August 2018, New South Wales Attorney-General Mark Speakman announced there would be an inquiry into the convictions, to "ensure public confidence in the administration of justice". "The petition appears to raise a doubt or question concerning the evidence as to the incidence of reported deaths of three or more infants in the same family attributed to unidentified natural causes in the proceedings leading to Ms Folbigg's convictions," he said.

Folbigg's legal team then approached Dr. Carola Garcia de Vinuesa, an immunologist at Australian National University and one of the first people in Australia to use genomic sequencing to link diseases to genetic variation, to examine the DNA samples of Folbigg's deceased children. Vinuesa and her colleague, geneticist Todor Arsov, first started with Folbigg's DNA, and both found a mutation in her CALM2 gene. CALM2 is one of three genes in the calmodulin family, which among other things help regulate the heart's expansions and contractions. Many CALM gene variations are linked with Long QT syndrome, a disorder that affects repolarisation (relaxing) of the heart after a heartbeat, giving rise to an abnormally lengthy QT interval. It can cause fast, chaotic heartbeats, and can be life-threatening. Vinuesa found Folbigg's mutation to be significant, as other calmodulin variants have been associated with severe cardiac disorders and sudden death in infancy.

However, in the 500-page report, released in July 2019, Reginald Blanch, a former chief judge of the District Court found he did not have "any reasonable doubt as to the guilt of Kathleen Megan Folbigg for the offences of which she was convicted".

=== Appeal against the judicial review ===
Folbigg's legal team promptly called for a review of the inquiry, citing "bias". The new evidence was presented to the appeal to the New South Wales Court of Appeal. The appeal was rejected on 24 March 2021.

=== Second judicial inquiry ===
On 18 May 2022, Attorney-General Mark Speakman announced another inquiry into Folbigg's convictions. On 5 June 2023 the NSW Attorney-General Michael Daley advised the Governor Margaret Beazley to exercise the royal prerogative of mercy and pardon Folbigg. She was released from prison the same day.

=== Exoneration ===
On 8 November 2023, ABC News reported that Folbigg would have her case referred to the Court of Criminal Appeal to consider whether she should be exonerated. On 14 December 2023, the court quashed her previous convictions, finding that there was reasonable doubt of her guilt.

== Scientific and medical opinion ==
=== Petition for pardon ===
On 4 March 2021, a petition signed by more than 100 eminent scientists, including Dr. Carola García de Vinuesa, was published by the Australian Academy of Science, calling for the NSW Governor to pardon Folbigg, and providing compelling scientific and medical explanations for each of the deaths. On 5 June 2023, Kathleen Folbigg was granted an unconditional pardon.

=== Cause of death ===
Genetic evidence published in November 2020 showed that at least two of the children had genetic mutations that predisposed them to sudden cardiac death. The researchers concluded that the CALM2 mutation carried by Kathleen and her two girls altered their heart rhythm, predisposing them to sudden unexpected death possibly precipitated by their intercurrent infections (respiratory tract infection in Sarah; myocarditis in Laura) and/or by medications such as Laura's pseudoephedrine. Mutations in CALM2 are observed at a very low frequency, occurring in approximately 1 out of every 35 million individuals. The CALM2 gene encodes a protein that plays a critical role in the regulation of heart rhythm.

The other two children, Caleb and Patrick, each carried two potentially lethal genetic mutations in the gene BSN (Bassoon Presynaptic Cytomatrix Protein), which is linked to early onset lethal epilepsy in mice, with one mutation inherited from their mother and the second one likely inherited from their father Craig. Patrick had epileptic seizures prior to his death. None of the four showed signs of smothering in the autopsy.

== See also ==
- Sally Clark, a British mother whose conviction for killing her two infant sons was overturned by medical evidence.
- Lindy Chamberlain-Creighton, a New Zealand–born Australian woman who was wrongfully convicted in one of Australia's most publicised murder trials.
- Patty Stallings, an American woman who was wrongfully convicted of murder after the death of her son.
- Maxine Robinson, UK serial child killer who confessed after a campaign to free her, leading her judge to state that it was a "timely" reminder that "not all mothers in prison for killing their children are victims of miscarriages of justice".
