= Maxine Robinson =

British serial killer (born 1968)

- Born: 1968 (age 57–58)
- Motive: Unable to cope with her children
- Penalty: Life imprisonment with a minimum tariff of 10 years (1995), increased by three years (2004)

Details
- Victims: 3
- Span of crimes: 1989–1993
- Country: United Kingdom
- Date apprehended: 1995 (for two murders)

Maxine Robinson (born 1968) is an English woman who murdered all three of her children between 1989 and 1993. Convicted of murdering two of the children in 1995, Robinson unsuccessfully appealed against her convictions, claiming their deaths had been natural. In 2004, her case and many other cases of multiple cot death came up for review as potentially unsafe. However, she admitted killing them before her case could be reviewed and further revealed that she had, in 1989, murdered her first-born child, whose death until then had been considered a result of SIDS. Her trial judge observed that Robinson's case was a "timely" reminder that "not all mothers in prison for killing their children are the victims of miscarriages of justice."

== Murders ==
In 1989, Robinson's nine-month-old daughter, Victoria, died suddenly at the family home in Pelton, near Chester-le-Street, County Durham. The death was not considered suspicious at the time and was judged to be a cot death. In 1993, both Robinson's 19-month-old daughter, Christine, and five-month-old son, Anthony, also died suddenly. Suspicion fell on Robinson because she had not employed the resuscitation training she received after Victoria's death. Robinson denied any wrongdoing and claimed the children also suffered cot death. Some experts called by the defence at her trial agreed with her claims that the deaths were natural, though a Home Office pathologist testified that the deaths were consistent with suffocation. Robinson was convicted of their murders at trial in 1995 by a narrow majority verdict. She appealed against the verdict, but her conviction was upheld.

== Confessions ==
Robinson's conviction had in part been based upon the evidence of paediatrician Roy Meadow, who had devised a statistical theory that said that more than one unexplained child death in a family was suspicious, and more than two indicated murder. Meadow's work was subsequently discredited and several convictions based upon his evidence were quashed, such as in the Angela Cannings, Trupti Patel and Sally Clark cases. In January 2004, the Attorney General ordered Robinson's conviction, along with many others based on Meadow's evidence, to be reviewed as potentially unsafe.

Before a review could occur, however, Robinson told a prison 'listener' (a prisoner trained by Samaritans to provide support to other prisoners) at HM Prison Durham that she had killed all three of her children, revealing that they had been smothered in their sleep. She was charged with Victoria's murder in April 2004. Although advised by her defence to plead guilty to infanticide with diminished responsibility, Robinson instead pleaded guilty to murder, saying she had smothered the baby with a deflated balloon. She said she had killed Victoria as she had been unable to cope with her, was depressed at the time and was criticised by her mother.

Robinson was already serving a life sentence for the murder of her two younger children when she pleaded guilty to murdering the oldest. The judge increased her minimum term by three years, remarking that the case was a "timely" reminder that "not all mothers in prison for killing their children are the victims of miscarriages of justice."

== See also ==
- Angela Cannings
- Donna Anthony
- Sally Clark
- Trupti Patel
- Louise Porton
- Infanticide
