= Roffey v The State of Western Australia =

Court of Appeal case in Western Australia

- Court: Supreme Court of Western Australia
- Citation: [2007] WASCA 246
- Transcript: http://www.austlii.edu.au/cgi-bin/viewdoc/au/cases/wa/WASCA/2007/246.html

Court membership
- Judges sitting: Steytler P, McLure JA, Miller JA

Case opinions
- appeal allowed 18 years is more than what is fairly required to achieve all the sentencing objectives including punishment, retribution and deterrence per McLure JA concurring Miller JA; Steytler P

Roffey v The State of Western Australia is a Court of Appeal decision of the Supreme Court of Western Australia in the field of criminal law.

The case is frequently cited in Western Australia for its elaboration of the 'totality principle', a legal doctrine often invoked where an appellant wishes to reduce the total imposed sentence for multiple charges, on the appeal ground that the aggregate sentence is manifestly excessive. Mr Roffey successfully obtained a reduction in sentence from an 18-year sentence to a sentence of 13 years and 6 months.

According to LawCite, the case has been cited the 2nd most times of any Western Australian Supreme Court decision.

== Facts ==
The appellant, a young adult, committed a series of crimes, including armed robberies, stealing motor vehicles, and other related offences. The sentencing judge imposed a total effective sentence of 18 years, taking into consideration the appellant's fast-track plea of guilty to all offences, cooperation with police, and relative youth.

The appellant argued that the sentence was excessive and against the totality principle, which consists of two limbs: the total effective sentence must bear a proper relationship to the overall criminality involved and the sentence should not be 'crushing.'

== Judgement ==
The court considered previous cases with similar offences and circumstances, noting that the sentences imposed in those cases were generally lower than the 18 years imposed on the appellant. After doing so, the court elaborated upon the totality principle, stating:

The appellant relies on the totality principle which comprises two limbs. The first limb is that the total effective sentence must bear a proper relationship to the overall criminality involved in all the offences, viewed in their entirety and having regard to the circumstances of the case, including those referable to the offender personally: _{Woods v The Queen (1994) 14 WAR 341}.

The second limb is that the court should not impose a 'crushing' sentence. The word crushing in this context connotes the destruction of any reasonable expectation of a useful life after release: _{Martino v The State of Western Australia [2006] WASCA 78 [16].} An aggregate sentence may be inappropriately long under the first limb even if it cannot be described as crushing: _{Jarvis v The Queen (1998) 20 WAR 201, 216 (Anderson J).}

The practical effect of the totality principle is ordinarily to arrive at an aggregate sentence that is less than that which would be arrived at by simply adding up all the terms appropriate for the individual offences: _{R v Holder [1983] 3 NSWLR 245, 260 (Street CJ).} A rationale for the totality principle is that there is assumed rehabilitation and reduced demand for retribution after the initial sentences have been served. Where the principle of totality comes into effect, it is of little importance how the ultimate aggregate is made up.

_{- McLure JA, Steytler P & Miller JA agreeing, at [24] - [26]}

The court agreed that the appellant's sentence was excessive and did not fairly achieve the sentencing objectives, which included punishment, retribution, and deterrence. The court decided to impose a term of 13 years and 6 months' imprisonment.

== Significance ==
According to Barnet Jade, Roffey is frequently cited by the Criminal Courts of Western Australia in cases that deal with the totality principle. Whilst the High Court has stated that Australia's common law is uniform, and this includes appeals on the manifest excess ground; Western Australian courts habitually tend to prefer to cite courts within their own jurisdiction, especially on criminal law matters.

== See also ==
- M v R
- Dietrich v The Queen
- Unsafe verdict
