= Carola Garcia de Vinuesa =

Spanish immunologist and scientist

Professor Carola Garcia de Vinuesa FRS FAA FAHMS
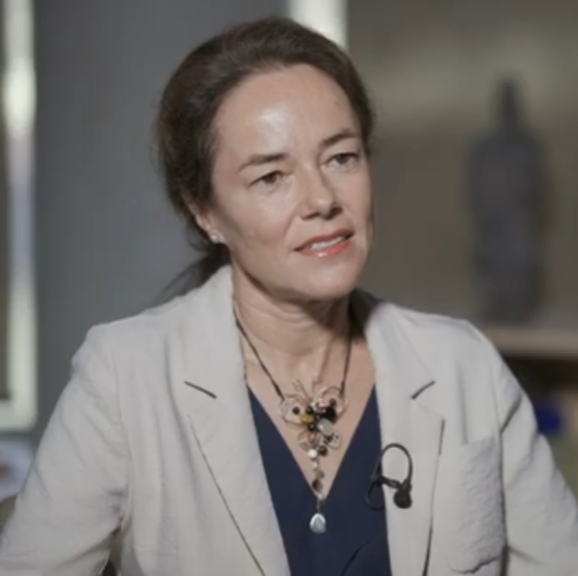
- In a 2019 interview
- Born: 1969 (age 56–57); Spain
- Education: Autonomous University of Madrid; University of Birmingham
- Known for: Immunogenetics
- Scientific career
- Fields: Immunology
- Workplaces: Francis Crick Institute; Australian Academy of Health and Medical Sciences; Australian Academy of Science

Carola Garcia de Vinuesa (born 1969) is a Spanish doctor, scientist, and professor. She is Royal Society Wolfson Fellow and Senior Group Leader at the Francis Crick Institute in London, and at the John Curtin School of Medical Research in Canberra. She is a winner of the Australian Science Minister's Prize for Life Scientist of the Year and the Gottschalk Medal.

== Education and career ==
Vinuesa obtained a Bachelor of Medicine at the Autonomous University of Madrid.

While she was a student, she worked in a leprosy clinic in Kolkata on the shores of the Ganges, and helped train health workers in Ghana in rural areas. She said that Ghanan children were overwhelmingly admitted for unpreventable meningitis, leading her to believe that her time would be better spent learning the cause of the deadly disease, to develop preventative measures. She moved to the United Kingdom (UK) to do clinical training and doctoral research investigating the biological mechanisms of meningitis.

She was awarded a Doctor of Philosophy (PhD) in Immunology by the University of Birmingham in 2000.

She received a Wellcome Trust International Travelling Fellowship in 2001 to undertake postdoctoral research at The John Curtin School for Medical Research at the Australian National University.

In 2005, she discovered a genetic variant in mice that led to an auto-immune disease.

In 2014, Vinuesa was awarded a grant, and that April, opened The Centre for Personalised Immunology at ANU. She was one of the first people in Australia to use genomic sequencing to link diseases to genetic variation.

In 2015, she was elected as a Fellow of the Australian Academy of Science.

In October 2020, she became a Fellow of the Australian Academy of Health and Medical Sciences.

In September 2021, the Lupus Research Alliance granted one of two of its $3 million Global Team Science Awards to Vinuesa's team, led by Dr. Virginia Pascual, to examine why lupus differs from patient to patient.

In 2022, Vinuesa relocated to the UK to take a new position at Francis Crick Institute. The following year she was elected a Fellow of the Academy of Medical Sciences. She was awarded the JBS Haldane Lecture by The Genetics Society in 2026.

=== CALM2 variant and the Kathleen Folbigg case (2018–present) ===
In August 2018, Vinuesa received a phone call from a former student who was concerned that Kathleen Folbigg may have been wrongfully convicted of infanticide. The student told her that the medical evidence presented at trial didn't "sit right" with several medical and legal experts, and thought Vinuesa's expertise in immunogenetics may help uncover an underlying disease that caused the Folbiggs' deaths. Vinuesa noted obvious signs of common causes for sudden infant death syndrome (SIDS), including floppy larynx and inflammation of the heart, that should have given reasonable doubt in the face of a lack of evidence of violence. Vinuesa agreed to consult on the case in an email to Folbigg's attorneys writing, "As a mother, I cannot think of a more worthy cause," and that she found it hard to believe someone could be imprisoned over it.

In November 2018, Vinuesa and a colleague, geneticist Dr. Todor Arsov, sequenced Folbigg's DNA and analyzed it for genetic mutations that could be linked to diseases that could cause SIDS or Sudden Unexpected Death in Childhood (SUDC). They discovered a mutation on a gene named CALM2 (G114R), in a genetic family named Calmodulin (CALM) which had previously been associated with fatal cardiac arrhythmias such as long QT syndrome, and SUDC. A genetic simulation on CALM2 showed it was likely just as dangerous as the other variants.

==== Hearings and testimony ====
The evidence presented in the reassessment of the New South Wales case was discounted as "speculation" by a team of scientists from Sydney commissioned by the Attorney General of Australia (AG). Dr. Michael Buckley, the Director of the Randwick Genomics Laboratory at the Prince of Wales Hospital, argued that they should use the criteria set by the American College of Medical Genetics and Genomics for determining likelihood of pathogenicity, which requires 90% certainty to determine if disease is a likely cause. Vinuesa rejected this as she believed it was their role to determine whether or not there was reasonable doubt that Folbigg was guilty, not whether or not Folbigg, or her late infants, should have a definitive diagnosis. One of the researchers from the AG team, Dr. Matthew Cook, agreed with Vinuesa, splitting the experts into two groups to write two reports.

During the reinvestigation, Vinuesa felt a lot of effort was placed to try and disqualify the experts on the side of the defence, rather than seeking the truth. Dr. Jonathan Skinner, who had gone over her medical files, testified that Folbigg had shown no signs of cardiac disease, and that it was not credible that Folbigg's children could have died from it. Arsov countered that Folbigg had recounted an incident of near-drowning when she was a teenager and had fainted while swimming in a pool, but a scientist on Buckley's team said her fainting may have been due to dehydration. The Sydney team also argued that they were not aware of CALM mutations causing death while asleep in young children.

==== Conclusion and verdict ====
In 2019, following the conclusion of the hearings, Furness determined that nothing presented by Vinuesa's team had "clearly explained" the deaths of the infants. Vinuesa was disturbed by the prosecution's unwillingness to have doubt cast on the previous verdict and the lack of calmodulin experts at the hearings, and set out to find the opinions of the best recognised international experts. One of them, Prof. Peter Schwartz of Istituto Auxologico Italiano, had just co-published a paper, Calmodulin mutations and life-threatening cardiac arrhythmias: insights from the International Calmodulinopathy Registry, which contained information about a family with a nearly identical CALM variant (G114W) in which two children suffered a sudden cardiac arrest while the mother, who had been the carrier of the gene's mutation, was seemingly healthy. He concluded he had "significant doubts" about Folbigg's conviction, and that the accusation of infanticide may have been premature.

Despite the CALM2 variant now qualifying as "likely pathogenic," Buckley's team and the prosecution seemed unwilling to accept the new evidence. Vinuesa dug into Schwartz's Registry and found that up to 20% of sudden cardiac deaths occur in sleep, and that there were nine reported cases of these types of deaths in infants and toddlers and wrote up a brief for the inquiry.

In July 2019, the presiding judicial officer, Reginald Blanch, delivered his verdict that Folbigg would remain in prison, citing that he "preferred" the expertise and evidence of Buckley and Skinner, and excerpts from a diary which showed evidence of postpartum depression, which Vinuesa felt showed a woman "grappling with the occasional despair of motherhood." Vinuesa reflected on society's pressure on mothers and her own experience."

==== Appeal ====
Vinuesa believed that the verdict was "deeply unjust," and continued her research into CALM2. She persuaded Danish biochemist, Michael Toft Overgard, to run tests on the mutation in a synthetic cell, resulting in unambiguous results that the CALM2 variant in Folbigg's DNA was not only arrythmogenic (i.e. “pathogenic” and therefore potentially lethal), but mirrored the results of other CALM variants known to cause death in young children while asleep. In 2020, Vinuesa, Arsov, Schwartz, and 24 other scientists co-authored a paper called, Infanticide vs. inherited cardiac arrhythmias, which was published that November by EP Europace. Folbigg's legal team used the paper as evidence in an appeal to the Supreme Court of New South Wales, but the judges upheld Blanch's decision.

==== Advocacy ====
In March 2021, Vinuesa, alongside more than 100 other scientists including two Nobel prize winners, signed a petition to grant Folbigg royal prerogative of mercy based on Vinuesa's research. The petition states that to keep Folbigg imprisoned sets a dangerous precedent that "cogent medical and scientific evidence can simply be ignored in preference to subjective interpretations and circumstantial evidence." Vinuesa since visited Folbigg in prison.

Also in March 2021, Vinuesa wrote an essay for The Conversation casting doubt on the verdict and sharing evidence her and her team had presented during the appeal. She also criticized the judicial process itself, saying that her experience discouraged her from engaging in cases in the future. She warned that if her experience is common of scientific experts, the law is risking engagement from the scientific community in legal matters. She said that scientists should be chosen who base their reasoning on "peer-reviewed scientific evidence," with specific expertise on the fields in question, and needed to be "treated as equals" to and by their legal peers during the process. She said that she hopes in the coming years that legal settings will welcome and appreciate the scientific method.

On 5 June 2023, as a result of the interventions of the scientific community, Kathleen Folbigg was granted an unconditional pardon and set free, pending the quashing of the 2003 verdict.

=== Roula Pispirigou Case ===
In September 2023, Vinuesa was involved in another child murder case, that of Roula Pispirigou in Greece, who was sentenced to three life terms for murdering her three children in Patras. Vinuesa testified as an expert witness for the defense. In her testimony, she stated that “the multiple pathological findings in the three girls constitute reasonable medical explanations for their natural deaths and suggest a hereditary congenital liver and heart disease with variable expressiveness.” And she concludes: “There is no clinical or scientific evidence to suggest that the mother was responsible for the death of her three children.”

== Awards and recognition ==
She was the 2008 winner of the Australian Science Minister's Prize for Life Scientist of the Year and the 2009 winner of the Australian Academy of Science's Gottschalk Medal for her research uncovering the origins of autoimmune diseases. In 2022 Vinuesa was elected a Fellow of the Royal Society. She received the 2026 FEBS | EMBO Women in Science Award.

== Personal life ==
Vinuesa was born and raised in Cadiz, Spain. She has two daughters. Vinuesa says her career decisions echoed her father's, who was a community-servant lawyer. He worked in the second democratic government in Spain as a treasury inspector.

As of August 2021, Vinuesa lives in the UK.
