= Sally Clark =

English woman falsely convicted of murder

- Born: Sally Lockyer; 15 August 1964; Devizes, England
- Died: 15 March 2007 (aged 42); Hatfield Peverel, England
- Citizenship: United Kingdom
- Occupation: Solicitor
- Known for: Wrongly convicted of killing her sons

Sally Clark (née Lockyer, 15 August 1964 – 15 March 2007) was an English solicitor who, in November 1999, became the victim of a miscarriage of justice when she was found guilty of the murder of her two infant sons. Clark's first son died in December 1996 within a few weeks of his birth, and her second son died in similar circumstances in January 1998. A month later, Clark was arrested and tried for both deaths. The defence argued that the children had died of sudden infant death syndrome (SIDS). The prosecution case relied on flawed statistical evidence presented by paediatrician Roy Meadow, who testified that the chance of two children from an affluent family suffering SIDS was 1 in 73 million. He had arrived at this figure by squaring his estimate of a chance of 1 in 8500 of an individual SIDS death in similar circumstances. The Royal Statistical Society later issued a statement arguing that there was no statistical basis for Meadow's claim, and expressed concern at the "misuse of statistics in the courts".

Clark was convicted in November 1999. The convictions were upheld on appeal in October 2000, but overturned in a second appeal in January 2003, after it emerged that Alan Williams, the prosecution forensic pathologist who examined both babies, had failed to disclose microbiological reports that suggested her younger son had died of natural causes. Clark was released from prison having served more than three years of her sentence. Journalist Geoffrey Wansell called Clark's experience "one of the great miscarriages of justice in modern British legal history". As a result of her case, the Attorney General Lord Goldsmith ordered a review of hundreds of other cases, and two other women had their convictions overturned. Clark's experience caused her to develop severe psychiatric problems and she died in her home in March 2007 from alcohol poisoning.

== Early life ==
Sally Clark was born Sally Lockyer in Devizes, Wiltshire, and was the only daughter of a father who was a senior police officer with Wiltshire Constabulary and a mother who was a hairdresser. She was educated at South Wilts Grammar School for Girls in Salisbury. She studied geography at Southampton University, and worked as a management trainee with Lloyds Bank and then at Citibank. She married solicitor Steve Clark in 1990, and left her job in the City of London to train in the same profession. She studied law at City, University of London, and trained at Macfarlanes, a city law firm. She moved with her husband to join the law firm Addleshaw Booth & Co in Manchester in 1994. They bought a house in Wilmslow in Cheshire.

== Conviction for murder ==
Clark's first son, Christopher, was born on 22 September 1996. Court documents describe him as a healthy baby. On 13 December Clark called an ambulance to the family home. The baby had fallen unconscious after being put to bed, and was declared dead after being taken to hospital. Clark had post-natal depression and received counselling at the Priory Clinic, but was in recovery by the time her second son, Harry, was born three weeks premature on 29 November 1997. However, he was also found dead on 26 January 1998, aged 8 weeks. On both occasions, Clark was at home alone with her baby and there was evidence of trauma, which could have been related to attempts to resuscitate them.

Clark and her husband were arrested on 23 February 1998 on suspicion of murdering their children. On the advice of her lawyers she twice refused to answer questions. She was later charged with two counts of murder while the case against her husband was dropped. Clark always denied the charge, and was supported throughout by her husband. During the court proceedings she gave birth to a third son.

Clark was tried at Chester Crown Court, before Mr Justice Harrison and a jury. The 17-day trial began on 11 October 1999. The prosecution, led by Robin Spencer QC, was controversial for its involvement of the paediatrician professor Sir Roy Meadow, former professor of paediatrics at the University of Leeds, who testified at Clark's trial that the chance of two children from an affluent family suffering cot death was 1 in 73 million. He likened the probability to the chances of backing an 80–1 outsider in the Grand National four years running, and winning each time.

Home Office pathologist Alan Williams withheld the results of bacteriology tests on Clark's second baby which showed the presence of the bacterium Staphylococcus aureus in multiple sites including his cerebro-spinal fluid. During the trial the jury asked specifically if there were any 'blood' test results for this child. Williams returned to the witness box to deal with their query. He was specifically asked about an entry in the notes referring to 'C&S' results. These referred to samples taken for culture and sensitivity (bacteriology) tests. In his responses, he failed to reveal the existence of these withheld test results.

Clark was convicted by a 10–2 majority verdict on 9 November 1999, and given the mandatory sentence of life imprisonment. She was widely reviled in the press as the murderer of her children. Despite recognition of the flaws in Meadow's statistical evidence, the convictions were upheld at appeal in October 2000. She was imprisoned at Styal women's prison, near her home in Wilmslow, and then Bullwood Hall women's prison in Hockley in Essex. The nature of her conviction as a child-killer, and her background as a solicitor and daughter of a police officer, made her a target for other prisoners. Her husband left his partnership at a Manchester law firm to work as a legal assistant nearer the prison, selling the family house to meet the legal bills from the trial and first appeal.

== Successful second appeal ==
Later, it came to light that microbiological tests showed that Harry had a colonisation of Staphylococcus aureus bacteria, indicating that he had died from natural causes, but the evidence had not been disclosed to the defence. This exculpatory evidence had been known to the prosecution's pathologist, Alan Williams, since February 1998, but was not shared with other medical witnesses, police or lawyers. The evidence was unearthed by Clark's husband from hospital records obtained by the divorce lawyer Marilyn Stowe, who provided her services free of charge because she felt that "something was not right about the case". It also became clearer that the statistical evidence presented at Clark's trial was seriously flawed.

For the second appeal, a report regarding the medical evidence was provided by Sam Gulino, a prosecution forensic pathologist for the State of Florida, US. He commented scathingly about the poor quality of the pathologists' work in these cases:

Throughout my review, I was horrified by the shoddy fashion in which these cases were evaluated. It was clear that sound medical principles were abandoned in favour of over-simplification, over-interpretation, exclusion of relevant data and, in several instances, the imagining of non-existent findings.

Clark's case was referred back to the Court of Appeal by the Criminal Cases Review Commission, and her convictions were overturned at her second appeal in January 2003. She was released from prison having served more than three years of her sentence.

=== Statistical evidence ===
The first trial was widely criticised for the misrepresentation of statistical evidence, particularly by Meadow. He stated in evidence as an expert witness that "one sudden infant death in a family is a tragedy, two is suspicious and three is murder unless proven otherwise" (Meadow's law). He claimed that, for an affluent non-smoking family like the Clarks, the probability of a single cot death was 1 in 8,543, so the probability of two in the same family was around "1 in 73 million" (8543 × 8543). Given that there are around 700,000 live births in Britain each year, Meadow argued that a double cot death would be expected to occur once every hundred years.

In October 2001, the Royal Statistical Society (RSS) issued a public statement expressing its concern at the "misuse of statistics in the courts". It noted that there was "no statistical basis" for the "1 in 73 million" figure. In January 2002, the RSS wrote to the Lord Chancellor pointing out that "the calculation leading to 1 in 73 million is false".

Meadow's calculation was based on the assumption that two SIDS deaths in the same family are independent. The RSS argued that "there are very strong reasons for supposing that the assumption is false. There may well be unknown genetic or environmental factors that predispose families to SIDS, so that a second case within the family becomes much more likely than would be a case in another, apparently similar, family." The prosecution did not provide any evidence to support its different assumption. In a 2004 article in Paediatric and Perinatal Epidemiology, Professor of Mathematics Ray Hill of Salford University concluded, using extensive SIDS statistics for England, that "after a first cot death the chances of a second become greatly increased" by a dependency factor of between 5 and 10.

The ruling was also subject to a statistical error known as the "prosecutor's fallacy". Many press reports of the trial reported that the "1 in 73 million" figure was the probability that Clark was innocent. However, even if the "1 in 73 million" figure were valid, this should not have been interpreted as the probability of Clark's innocence. In order to calculate the probability of Clark's innocence, the jury needed to weigh up the relative likelihood of the two competing explanations for the children's deaths. In other words, murder was not the only alternative explanation for the deaths in the way that one might have inferred from asserted probability of double SIDS. Although double SIDS is very rare, double infant murder is likely to be rarer still, so the probability of Clark's innocence was quite high. Hill calculated the odds ratio for double SIDS to double homicide at between 4.5:1 and 9:1, that is double SIDS is twice as likely as double murder.

Hill raised a third objection to the "1 in 73 million" figure. Meadow arrived at the 1 in 8,500 figure by taking into account three key characteristics possessed by the Clark family, all of which make SIDS less likely. However, Hill said that Meadow "conveniently ignored factors such as both the Clark babies being boys – which make cot death more likely". Hill also argued:

When a cot death mother is accused of murder, the prosecution sometimes employs a tactic such as the following. If the parents are affluent, in a stable relationship and non-smoking, the prosecution will claim that the chances of the death being natural are greatly reduced, and by implication that the chances of the death being homicide are greatly increased. But this implication is totally false, because the very same factors which make a family low risk for cot death also make it low risk for murder.

During the second appeal, the court noted that Meadow's calculations were subject to a number of qualifications, but "none of these qualifications were referred to by Professor Meadow in his evidence to the jury and thus it was the headline figures of 1 in 73 million that would be uppermost in the jury's minds". The appeal court concluded that "the evidence should never have been before the jury in the way that it was when they considered their verdicts". The judges continued, "we rather suspect that with the graphic reference by Professor Meadow to the chances of backing long odds winners of the Grand National year after year it may have had a major effect on [the jury's] thinking notwithstanding the efforts of the trial judge to down play it".

== Aftermath ==
Clark's release in January 2003 prompted the Attorney General Lord Goldsmith to order a review of hundreds of other cases. Two other women convicted of murdering their children, Donna Anthony and Angela Cannings, had their convictions overturned and were released from prison. Trupti Patel, who was also accused of murdering her three children, was acquitted in June 2003. In each case, Roy Meadow had testified about the unlikelihood of multiple cot deaths in a single family.

Meadow was struck off the medical register by the General Medical Council in 2005 for serious professional misconduct. It was during the GMC hearing that, when questioned directly, he made his first public apology for the effect of his 'misleading' evidence. He cited 'legal advice' and 'professional etiquette' as the reasons for the delay. Then current GMC professional conduct guidance did not support his 'professional etiquette' reason. He was reinstated in 2006 after he appealed and the court ruled (2 to 1) that his actions in court had amounted to misconduct though not serious enough to warrant him being struck off. The senior judge on the panel, Master of the Rolls Sir Anthony Clarke, dissented from the view of his two colleagues. In his opinion Meadow's actions had amounted to serious professional misconduct.

In June 2005, Alan Williams, the Home Office pathologist who conducted the postmortem examinations on both the Clark babies, was banned from Home Office pathology work and coroners' cases for three years after the General Medical Council found him guilty of "serious professional misconduct" in the Clark case. At the same time he had chosen to withhold evidence of infection as a possible cause of the death of the second baby, he changed his original opinion regarding the first baby from death caused by lower respiratory infection to unnatural death by smothering. He failed to give any good reason for this change in opinion and his competence was called into question. His conduct was severely criticised by other experts giving evidence and opinion to the court and in the judicial summing up of the successful second appeal. He was given the opportunity to address the court to explain his decision to withhold the laboratory results. He declined to do so. The decision of the GMC was upheld by the High Court in November 2007. Earlier that year he had successfully appealed against the decision to ban him from performing Home Office postmortem examinations; the ban was replaced by an 18-month suspension which by then had passed.

== Death ==
The nature of Clark's wrongful conviction as a child-killer, and her background as a solicitor and daughter of a police officer, made her a target for other prisoners. According to her family, Clark was unable to recover from the effects of her conviction and imprisonment. After her release, her husband said she would "never be well again". A family spokesman stated "Sally was unable to come to terms with the false accusations, based on flawed medical evidence and the failures of the legal system, which debased everything she had been brought up to believe in and which she herself practised." It was stated in the later inquest that she was diagnosed with a number of severe psychiatric problems, "these problems included enduring personality change after catastrophic experience, protracted grief reaction and alcohol dependency syndrome." Clark was found dead in her home in Hatfield Peverel in Essex on 16 March 2007. It was originally thought that she had died of natural causes, but an inquest ruled that she had died of acute alcohol intoxication, though the coroner stressed that there was no evidence of intention to die by suicide.

== See also ==
- Maxine Robinson – UK serial killer mother exposed, with the assistance of Meadow, around the same time as Clark and others in similar cases were freed, leading the judge to comment that the case was "a timely reminder that not all mothers in prison for killing their children are the victims of miscarriages of justice"
- David Southall
- Lucia de Berk
- Kathleen Folbigg
- Patricia Stallings
- Betty Tyson

== Bibliography ==
- Leila Schneps and Coralie Colmez, Math on trial. How numbers get used and abused in the courtroom, Basic Books, 2013. ISBN 978-0-465-03292-1. (First chapter: "Math error number 1: multiplying non-independent probabilities. The case of Sally Clark: motherhood under attack").
- John Batt, Stolen Innocence: The Sally Clark Story – A Mother's Fight for Justice Elbury Press, 2004. ISBN 0-09-190070-0.
- Ian McEwan, The Children Act.
