= Roy Meadow =

British paediatrician (born 1933)

Sir Samuel Roy Meadow
- Born: 9 June 1933 (age 93); Wigan, Lancashire, England
- Occupation: Paediatrician
- Known for: Wrongful convictions of mothers for murdering their babies; Meadow's law

Sir Samuel Roy Meadow (born 9 June 1933) is a British retired paediatrician who facilitated several wrongful convictions of mothers for murdering their babies. He was awarded the Donald Paterson prize of the British Paediatric Association in 1968 for a study of the effects on parents of having a child in hospital. In 1976 Money and Werlwas coined the term Munchausen Syndrome by Proxy (Money J, Werlwas J. Folie a deux in the parents of psychosocial dwarfs:two cases. Bill Am Acad Psychiatry Law. 1976;4(4):351-62. PMID 1028417.) In 1977, Meadow published an academic paper describing the phenomenon Money and Werlwas dubbed Munchausen syndrome by proxy (MSbP). In 1980 he was awarded a professorial chair in paediatrics at St James's University Hospital, Leeds, and in 1998, he was knighted for services to child health.

His work became controversial, particularly arising from the consequences of a belief he stated in his 1997 book ABC of Child Abuse that, in a single family, "one sudden infant death is a tragedy, two is suspicious and three is murder, until proved otherwise". This became known as "Meadow's law" and was influential in the thinking of UK social workers and child protection agencies, such as the National Society for the Prevention of Cruelty to Children.

Meadow's reputation was severely damaged after his appearances as an expert witness for the prosecution in several trials played a crucial part in wrongful convictions for murder. Despite having fundamental misunderstandings of statistics, he presented himself as an expert in the field. Meadow's miscalculations significantly contributed towards the wrongful imprisonment of innocent mothers whom he branded murderers. The British General Medical Council (GMC) struck him from the British Medical Register after he was found to have offered erroneous and misleading evidence in the 1999 trial of Sally Clark, who was wrongly convicted of the murder of her two baby sons. Clark's conviction was overturned in 2003 but she never recovered from the experience, and died in 2007 from acute alcohol poisoning.

Clark's father, Frank Lockyer, complained to the GMC, alleging serious professional misconduct on the part of Meadow. The GMC concluded in July 2005 that Meadow was guilty, but he appealed to the High Court, which in February 2006 ruled in his favour. The GMC appealed to the Court of Appeal, but in October 2006, by a majority decision, the court upheld the ruling that Meadow was not guilty of the GMC's charge. The reason was that his behaviour in court did not impact his care for his own patients.

== Career ==
Meadow was born in Wigan, Lancashire, the son of Samuel and Doris Meadow. He was educated at Wigan Grammar School and Bromsgrove School, before studying medicine at Worcester College, Oxford. From 1962 to 1964 he practised as a general practitioner in Banbury, Oxfordshire, before progressing to junior appointments at various hospitals in London and Brighton. In 1967 he became a Medical Research Council Fellow at the University of Birmingham, and three years later was appointed senior lecturer and consultant paediatrician at the University of Leeds. Meadow was appointed professor of paediatrics and child health at Leeds in 1980, based at St James's University Hospital. He retired with the title Emeritus Professor in 1998.

Throughout his early years in medicine, Meadow was a devoted admirer of Anna Freud (daughter of Sigmund Freud), whose lectures he would often attend. Speaking in later life, he said: "I was, as a junior, brought up by Anna Freud, who was a great figure in child psychology, and I used to sit at her feet at Maresfield Gardens in Hampstead. She used to teach us that a child needs mothering and not a mother." There is some controversy over these claims. According to the London Evening Standard, representatives of the Anna Freud Centre claimed to have no record of him completing a formal training there and repudiated his description of her philosophy.

In 1961, Meadow married Gillian Maclennan, daughter of Sir Ian Maclennan, the British ambassador to Ireland. The couple had two children, Julian and Anna, before divorcing in 1974. Four years later he married his second wife, Marianne Jane Harvey.

== Munchausen syndrome by proxy ==
In 1977, in The Lancet medical journal, Meadow proposed the existence of a disorder that he called Munchausen syndrome by proxy or MSbP, whose sufferers claim harm or fake symptoms of illness in persons under their care (usually their own children) in order to gain the attention and sympathy of medical personnel. Meadow postulated the syndrome based on the behaviour of two mothers: one had poisoned her toddler with excessive quantities of salt. The other had introduced her own blood into her baby's urine sample. Although it was initially regarded with scepticism, MSbP soon gained a following amongst doctors and social workers.

== Expert testimony ==
In 1993, Meadow gave expert testimony at the trial of Beverley Allitt, a paediatric nurse accused (and later found guilty) of murdering several of her patients.

Meadow went on to testify in many other trials, many of which concerned cases previously diagnosed as cot death or sudden infant death syndrome (SIDS). Meadow was convinced that many apparent cot deaths were the result of physical abuse. Families that had suffered more than one cot death were to attract particular attention: "There is no evidence that cot deaths runs in families", said Meadow, "but there is plenty of evidence that child abuse does". His rule of thumb was that "unless proven otherwise, one cot death is tragic, two is suspicious and three is murder". This has become known as Meadow's law.

== Cot death trial controversies ==
This trend was to reach its apogee in 1999 when solicitor Sally Clark was tried for allegedly murdering her two babies. Her elder son Christopher had died at the age of 11 weeks, and her younger son Harry at 8 weeks. Medical opinion was divided on the cause of death, and several leading paediatricians testified that the deaths were probably natural. Experts acting for the prosecution initially diagnosed that the babies had been shaken to death, but three days before the trial began several of them changed their collective opinion to smothering.

By the time he gave evidence at Sally Clark's trial, Meadow claimed to have found 81 cot deaths which were in fact murder, but he had destroyed the data. His evidence included the claim that the odds against two cot deaths occurring in the same family was 73,000,000:1, a figure which he obtained by squaring the observed ratio of live-births to cot deaths in affluent non-smoking families (approximately 8,500:1). He claimed that a 1 in 73,000,000 incidence was only likely to occur once every hundred years in England, Scotland and Wales, and stated that the very unlikely odds were the same as successfully backing to win an 80/1 outsider in the Grand National for four successive years. The jury returned a 10/2 majority verdict of "guilty".

== Misuse of statistics ==
Meadow's 73,000,000:1 statistic was paraded in the popular press and received criticism from professional statisticians over its calculation. The Royal Statistical Society issued a press release stating that the figure had "no statistical basis", and that the case was "one example of a medical expert witness making a serious statistical error." The Society's president, Professor Peter Green, later wrote an open letter of complaint to the Lord Chancellor about these concerns.

The statistical criticisms were threefold: firstly, Meadow was accused of applying the so-called prosecutor's fallacy in which the probability of "cause given effect" (i.e., the true likelihood of a suspect's innocence) is confused with that of "effect given cause" (the probability that an innocent person would lose two children in this manner). In reality, these quantities can only be equated when the a priori likelihood of the alternative hypothesis, in this case murder, is close to certainty. Murder (especially double murder) is itself a rare event, whose probability must be weighed against that of the null hypothesis (natural death).

The second criticism concerned the ecological fallacy: Meadow's calculation had assumed that the cot death probability within any single family was the same as the aggregate ratio of cot deaths to births for the entire affluent-non-smoking population. No account had been taken of conditions specific to individual families (such as the hypothesised cot death gene) which might make some more vulnerable than others. Finally, Meadow assumed that SIDS cases within families were statistically independent. The occurrence of one cot death makes it likely that the family in question has such conditions, and the probability of subsequent deaths is therefore greater than the group average. (Estimates are mostly in the region of 1:100.)

Some mathematicians have estimated that taking all these factors into account, the true odds may have been greater than 2:1 in favour of the death not being murder, and hence demonstrating Clark's innocence.

The perils of allowing non-statisticians to present unsound statistical arguments were expressed in a British Medical Journal (BMJ) editorial by Stephen Watkins, Director of Public Health for Stockport, claiming that "defendants deserve the same protection as patients."

== Sally Clark appeals ==
Meadow's statistical figure was amongst the five grounds for appeal submitted to the Court of Appeal in the autumn of 2000. The judges claimed that the figure was a "sideshow", which would have had no significant effect on the jury's decision. The overall evidence was judged to be "overwhelming" and Clark's appeal against conviction was dismissed. Clark's supporters rejected this decision. Meadow considered that he had been fully vindicated. He responded to Watkins in a BMJ paper of his own, accusing him of being both irresponsible and misinformed. He reiterated his erroneous claim that "both children showed signs of both recent and past abuse" (injuries which the defence claimed were either misidentified in a badly-performed post-mortem, or caused by the mother's attempts at resuscitation) and underlined the judges' controversial ruling that Clark and her husband had given "untrue evidence".

Meadow's vindication was to be short-lived: after the campaigning lawyer Marilyn Stowe obtained new evidence from Macclesfield Hospital, it emerged that another expert witness, Home Office Pathologist Dr Alan Williams, had failed to disclose exculpatory evidence in the form of results of medical tests which showed that her second child had died from the bacterial infection Staphylococcus aureus, and not from smothering as the prosecution had claimed. A second appeal was launched and in allowing Clark's appeal to proceed Lord Justice Kay stated in open court that Meadow's statistics were 'grossly misleading' and 'manifestly wrong'.

Although the central reasons for the Clark appeal's success were separate from Meadow's evidence, the discredited statistics were revisited in the hearing. In their ruling, in marked contrast to the opinions at the first appeal, the judges stated that:

"....if this matter had been fully argued before us we would, in all probability, have considered that the statistical evidence provided a quite distinct basis upon which the appeal had to be allowed."

Sally Clark's conviction was overturned in January 2003.

=== Death of Sally Clark ===
Sally Clark died unintentionally on 16 March 2007 from acute alcohol intoxication.

She never recovered from the severe psychological trauma resulting from the experience of the deaths of two children, then being unjustly convicted of their murder with subsequent imprisonment leading to her being separated from her third baby.

== Trupti Patel ==
In June 2003, the CPS used Meadow's expert testimony against Trupti Patel, a pharmacist accused of killing three of her babies. After a highly publicised trial lasting several weeks, the jury took less than 90 minutes to return a unanimous verdict of "not guilty". Even then, a spokesperson for the prosecution stated that the crown would still be "very happy" to use Meadow's evidence in future trials. However, the Solicitor General for England and Wales, Harriet Harman (whose sister is Sarah Harman, a lawyer involved in another subsequent high-profile case where the parents had been accused of harming their children) effectively barred Meadow from court work; she warned prosecution lawyers that the defence should be informed of court criticisms of Meadow's evidence.

== Angela Cannings ==
The following December Angela Cannings, a mother convicted on Meadow's evidence, was freed on appeal. She had been wrongly convicted of murdering two of her three babies, both of whom had died in their first few weeks of life. Following the quashing of her convictions, Meadow found himself under investigation by the British General Medical Council for alleged professional misconduct.

Cannings' case differed from Clark's in that there was no physical evidence. The prosecution rested upon what was perceived to be "suspicious behaviour" on the part of the mother (telephoning her husband instead of emergency services when one of the deaths occurred) and upon Meadow's opinion that she was an MSbP sufferer. He had told the jury that the boys could not have been genuine cot death victims because they were fit and healthy right up until the time of death (contradicting other experts who claim this is typical of SIDS cases). The prosecution had also rejected any genetic explanation, stating that there was no family history of cot death. Although no enumerated statistics had been presented, Meadow had told the jury that double cot death was extremely unlikely. The jurors took nine hours to return a guilty verdict.

Cannings had already lost one appeal but, in the wake of the Clark and Patel acquittals, the case was "fast tracked" for a second appeal. In the weeks that followed, an investigation by the BBC showed that the prosecution's "no family history" argument had been incorrect: at least two of Cannings' paternal ancestors had lost an abnormally large number of infants to unexplained causes, making a genetic predisposition to cot death highly plausible.

The appeal was heard in December 2003 and the Court of Appeal declared the original conviction unsafe and allowed Cannings' appeal.

== Aftermath ==
In January 2004, the Deputy Chief Justice, Lord Justice Judge, gave the full reasons for allowing Cannings' appeal. His comments included criticism of Meadow's evidence, of his standing as an expert witness and of 'experts' adopting an over-dogmatic stance :

"Therefore the flawed evidence he gave at Sally Clark's trial serves to undermine his high reputation and authority as a witness in the forensic process. It also, and not unimportantly for present purposes, demonstrates not only that in this particular field which we summarise as "cot deaths", even the most distinguished expert can be wrong, but also provides a salutary warning against the possible dangers of an over-dogmatic expert approach".

Only a relatively small number of appeals were actually launched, though most of these were successful (including that of Donna Anthony, who served six years after being wrongly convicted of killing her son and daughter). In addition to this, the law was changed such that no person can be convicted on the basis of expert testimony alone.

On 21 June 2005, Meadow appeared before a GMC fitness to practise tribunal. On the first day of Meadow's defence, Dr Richard Horton, Editor of The Lancet, published an article in defence of Meadow. This controversial interference in the GMC process 'incensed' Sally Clark. Her husband, Stephen, later wrote to the Lancet to highlight Horton's "many inaccuracies and one-sided opinions" in order to prevent them prejudicing independent observers.

On 13 July, the tribunal ruled that his evidence in the Clark case was indeed misleading and incorrect and on 15 July decided he was guilty of "serious professional misconduct".

It was during the hearing that, when questioned directly on the matter, Meadow made his first public apology for the effect of his 'misleading' evidence. He cited the reasons for the delay as being 'legal advice' and 'professional etiquette'. The failure to apologise, and not admitting that he was wrong, was the reason why Sally Clark's father, Frank Lockyer, had raised his concerns about Meadow with the GMC.

His failure to apologise spontaneously was not his first departure from good ethical conduct in this case; during a break at Clark's committal hearing at Macclesfield Magistrates' Court Meadow had approached the defence team and addressed Sally Clark saying, 'this is terrible for me, it must be awful for you.' He was instructed by Clark's barrister Michael Mackey to 'go away'.

The decision was made that his name should be struck from the medical register. The Society of Expert Witnesses commented that the severity of this punishment would cause many professionals to reconsider whether to stand as expert witnesses.

The following month, Meadow launched an appeal against this ruling. On 17 February 2006, High Court judge Mr Justice Collins found in his favour, ruling against the decision to strike him from the medical register. The judge stated that although the GMC had been right to criticize him, his actions could not properly be regarded as "serious professional misconduct".

On 26 October 2006, the Appeal Court overturned the High Court's earlier ruling, allowing expert witnesses to be disciplined once again but ruled that the High Court decision that Meadow was not guilty of serious professional misconduct should stand. However, on the issue of serious professional misconduct, the Appeal Court panel was split 2:1 with the dissenting senior judge, Sir Anthony Clarke, concluding Meadow was "guilty of serious professional misconduct" and provided detailed reasons for his conclusion. One of the other two judges, Lord Justice Auld, said Meadow "was undoubtedly guilty of some professional misconduct" but that it "fell far short of serious professional misconduct" (see Richard Webster's article discussing the judgment.)

In 2004, Meadow's ex-wife, Gillian Paterson, accused Meadow of seeing "mothers with Munchausen's Syndrome by Proxy wherever he looked," and implied that he was a misogynist: "I don't think he likes women... although I can't go into details, I'm sure he has a serious problem with women".

In 2009, Meadow relinquished his registration with the GMC and thus became unlicensed to practice medicine. In addition this voluntary erasure from the list of registered medical practitioners meant that he would no longer be answerable to the GMC should any further concerns be raised regarding any previous professional activity.

== Ian and Angela Gay ==
In the 2005 trial of Ian and Angela Gay over the death of their adopted son Christian, the prosecution relied heavily upon Meadow's 1993 paper "Non-accidental salt poisoning", citing it many times throughout the trial. The judge also referred to the paper citing it five times during his summing up. Ian and Angela Gay were found guilty of manslaughter and spent 15 months in prison before their convictions were quashed.

In interviews for BBC Radio 4's File on 4 programme, Professor Jean Golding and Professor Ashley Grossman both questioned the reliability of the Meadow paper. The naturally occurring condition diabetes insipidus was suggested as a more likely cause of an elevated salt level than deliberate salt poisoning.

== See also ==
- Miscarriage of justice
- Timeline of young people's rights in the United Kingdom
- Charles Smith (pathologist)

== Bibliography ==
- Schneps, Leila; Colmez, Coralie (2013). "Math error number 1: multiplying non-independent probabilities. The case of Sally Clark: motherhood under attack". Math on trial. How numbers get used and abused in the courtroom. Basic Books. ISBN 978-0-465-03292-1.
