= Jean Golding =

Epidemiologist and founder of the Children of the 90s project

Professor Jean Golding OBE FMedSci
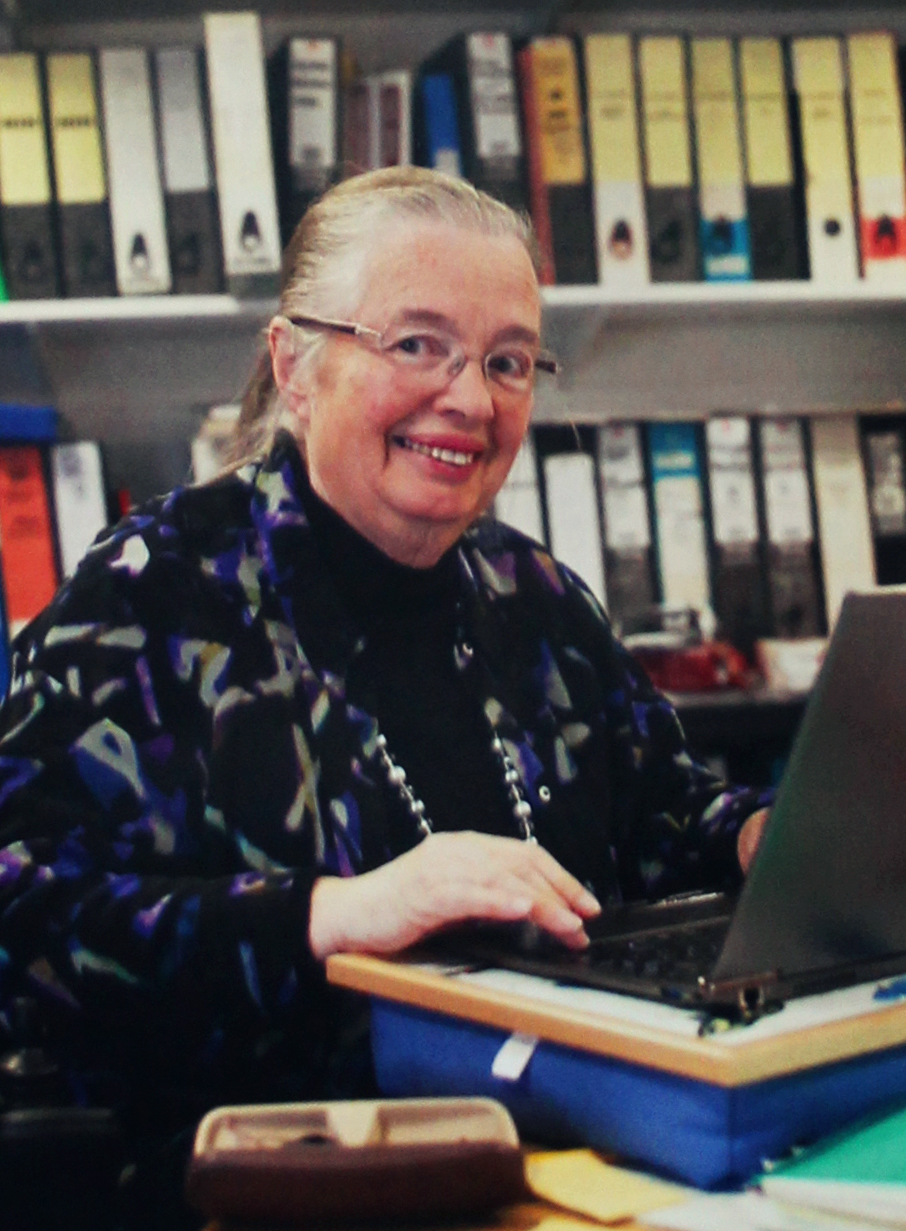
- Jean Golding
- Born: 22 September 1939 (age 86)
- Occupation: Epidemiologist
- Known for: Avon Longitudinal Study of Parents and Children (ALSPAC)

Jean Golding (née Bond; born 22 September 1939) is a British epidemiologist, and founder of the Avon Longitudinal Study of Parents and Children (ALSPAC), also known as "Children of the Nineties". She is emeritus Professor of Paediatric and Perinatal Epidemiology at the University of Bristol.

== Early life and education ==
Born in Hayle, Cornwall in 1939, Golding struggled with illness throughout her childhood. Her regular stays in hospital led to a delay in the beginning of her education, eventually starting school when she was six years old. Her family moved to Chester, after a period living in Plymouth, and within a few weeks she contracted polio, causing her to miss another year of school and causing a disability that would remain with her permanently. Despite these interruptions to her schooling, she won a place studying mathematics at St Anne's College, Oxford in 1958, from where she was awarded an honours BA, and subsequently MA.

== Career and research ==
In 1966 she joined a team in London, headed by Neville Butler and Eva Alberman, analysing data collected in the 1958 Perinatal Mortality Survey (later the 1958 birth cohort) British birth cohort studies. She then obtained a research fellowship in the Galton Laboratory of Human Genetics and Biometry, University College London Galton Laboratory to study the aetiology of neural tube defects. Subsequent research at the University of Oxford, involved working with large data sets including the Oxford Record Linkage Study.

In 1980 she moved to the University of Bristol, where she was involved in analysing data from the national 1970 birth cohort British birth cohort studies. During the 1980s she was responsible for assisting in designing and augmenting a major perinatal survey in Jamaica 1985–6, and developed, and was the initial Director of the European Longitudinal Study of Pregnancy and Childhood (ELSPAC). This led to the founding of ALSPAC (Avon Longitudinal Study of Parents and Children), also known as Children of the 90s, a birth cohort study, the overall aim of which is to determine the ways in which different aspects of the environment influence child health and development, and how these may be influenced by genetics. The study has resulted in a highly detailed dataset of children born in the Avon area in 1991 and 1992, their parents and, as time has gone on, their own children. It continues to record biological, psychological, social and medical information of these groups throughout their childhoods and into their adult lives ALSPAC. The dataset is used by researchers across the world, and it includes interviews, questionnaires, biological samples, hands-on testing and linkage to educational and other records. Data collection has continued since the children were born. Golding's decision on what data was useful to collect has led to it being used for genetic and Epigenetics research worldwide, and, by 2019, around 2000 peer-reviewed papers based on this resource have been published.

In 1987 she was the founding editor of the international journal: Paediatric and Perinatal Epidemiology and continued as editor-in-chief until 2012. Golding has continued to carry out research on the ALSPAC resource long into retirement, and has concentrated since 2016 on the following: i) Ways in which the aspect of personality known as Locus of Control of the parents and children influences behaviours, and long term outcomes (with Stephen Nowicki, at Emory University), ii) Ways in which environmental exposures to grandparents and great-grandparents are associated with outcomes in grandchildren and great-grandchildren, including of autism, and obesity (with Marcus Pembrey and Matthew Suderman). iii) Long-term outcomes of offspring relating to various exposures of the mother including medications (such as paracetamol/acetaminophen), heavy metals (especially mercury) and aspects of the diet (especially the benefits of fish consumption) iv) The question as to whether religious and/or spiritual beliefs affect behaviours and how that might impact health and development.

== Awards and honours ==
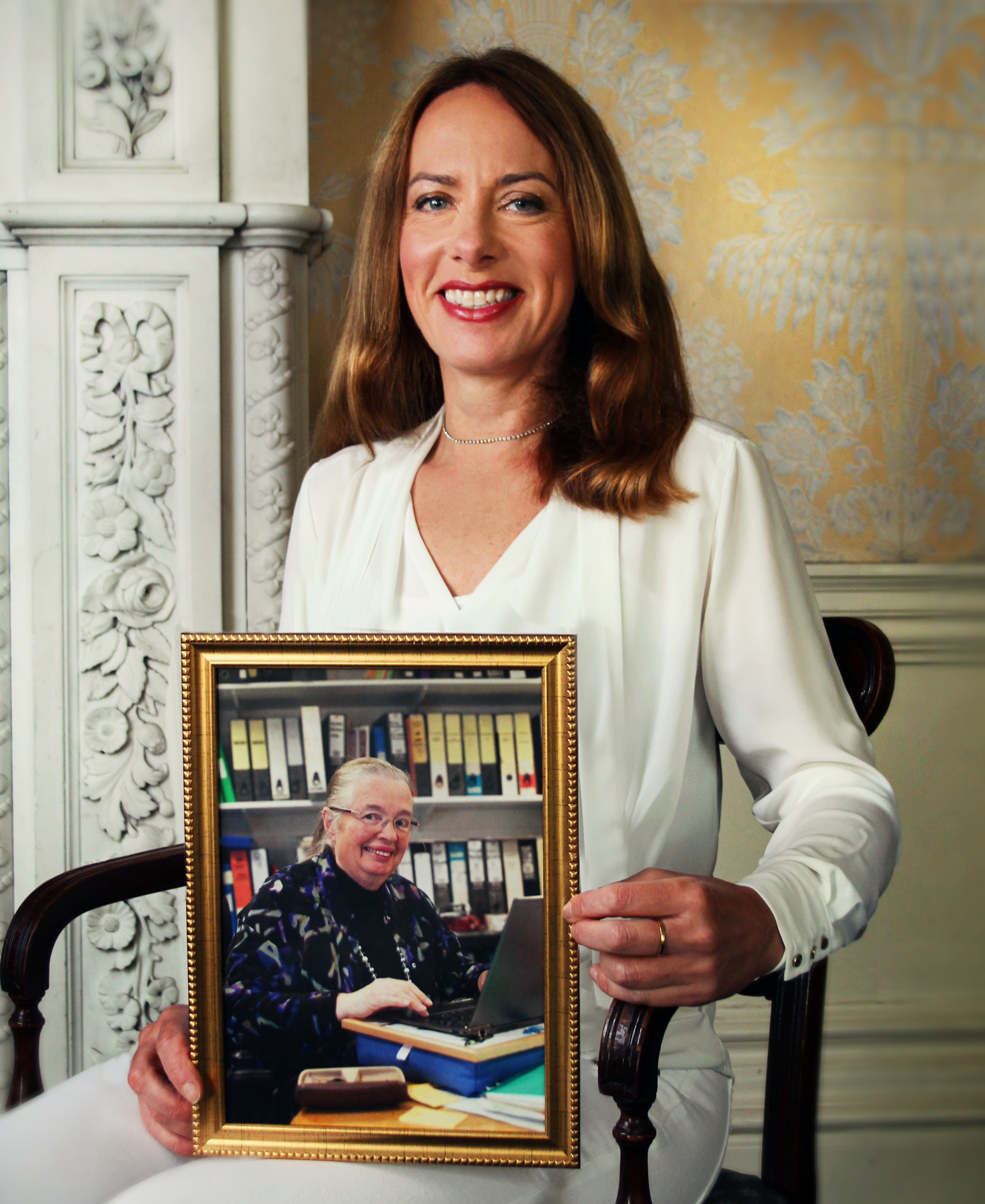
Kate Robson Brown with Professor Jean Golding OBE

Golding was elected a Fellow of the Academy of Medical Sciences in 2002.

In 2012 she was made an Officer of the Order of the British Empire for services to medical science.

In 2013, she received an honorary Doctor of Laws degree from the University of Bristol, acclaimed as an "exemplar of the qualities and values the institution promotes".

In 2016, the University of Bristol created the Jean Golding Institute, a multidisciplinary data science and data-intensive research hub, in honour of her work as a mathematician, epidemiologist and founder of the Children of the 90s cohort study.

In 2017, she received an honorary Doctor of Science from University College London for her pioneering work on longitudinal population studies.

In 2018, as a celebration of the 70 years since the start of the NHS, she was made one of seven "NHS Research Legends".

In 2018, the University of Bristol honoured its pioneering women in suffrage centenary portraits, which were unveiled as part of the 'Women and equality: the next 100 years' event. Kate Robson Brown, the Director of the Jean Golding Institute, holding a portrait of Jean Golding OBE.

Again in 2018, in response to a national call by English Heritage Put her Forward campaign (in response to the realisation of the paucity of statues of women in Britain), Golding was nominated, and among 25 women to have a 3-D printed statuette. This is currently displayed in the Royal Fort House at the University of Bristol.

In 2022, she was elected a member of the Academia Europaea.

On 18 November 2022, she was the guest of an episode of Desert Island Discs.
