= David Southall =

British paediatrician

David Southall OBE is a retired British paediatrician who specialised in international maternal and child hospital healthcare and in child protection. He worked in Bosnia and Herzegovina in 1993-1995, for which he received an OBE in 1999. In 1995 he set up the charity Maternal and Childhealth Advocacy International (MCAI), of which he remains a trustee as of 2023. His child protection work and research into Munchausen syndrome by proxy attracted controversy and led to conflict with the General Medical Council.

== Early career ==
Prior to becoming a paediatrician, Southall spent four years in general adult medicine, one year in obstetrics and two years as a general practitioner.

== International humanitarian work ==
In 1993, during the Bosnian War, Southall was invited by the Overseas Development Administration of the British Government (now DFID) to visit Sarajevo to identify and evacuate children in need of urgent medical treatment which could not be provided locally because of armed conflict. After this mission he was asked by UNICEF to become a consultant and lead a programme from 1993-1995 to help children in Mostar and in camps for internally displaced families in other areas of Bosnia. Prompted by his experiences in Bosnia of what he described as "trauma inflicted on children and their families, not only by warring factions, but also by the indolence of the international community", Southall established Child Advocacy International (CAI) on his return to the UK, to advocate for international child health issues. Since 2009, and in order to reflect the close involvement of CAI with the emergency care of pregnant women and adolescent girls, the charity was re-named Maternal and Childhealth Advocacy International (MCAI).

Some of the main advocacy undertaken involved campaigns against the arms trade, healthcare in refugee camps and the development of the Maternal and Child Friendly Healthcare Initiatives (see below). One particular success with advocacy involved the New Jalozai Afghan refugee camp where the Pakistan Government were encouraged by CAI to move the 70,000 refugees living in appalling circumstances into a more suitable camp. The United Nations High Commission for Refugees (UNHCR) wrote a letter to Southall thanking CAI for this achievement.

From 1999 to 2004 Southall was Chairman of a working party developing the Child Friendly Healthcare Initiative (CFHI). In addition to CAI, UNICEF UK, The Royal College of Paediatrics and Child Health and the Royal College of Nursing were parties to this work.

Since 2002, and following on to CAI's work in Afghanistan and Pakistan, and in collaboration with a British Medical Education charity a program called “Strengthening Emergency Healthcare” involving Emergency Maternal, Neonatal and Child Healthcare (EMNCH) was established. The program was originally started in the Afghan refugee camps in Pakistan and has subsequently been developed in Pakistan with assistance from the local offices of the World Health Organization (WHO) and UNICEF. In 2006, it was successfully introduced into The Gambia following a recommendation from WHO Geneva. In November 2012 a similar programme was started in Liberia with financial support from THET and UKAID.

Additional programs of CAI and subsequently of MCAI involved apprenticeship based training in hospital care of pregnant women, newborn infants and children in Kosovo, Sri Lanka, Afghanistan, Uganda, The Gambia and Liberia.

== Respiratory research and child protection work ==
Between 1979 and 1983 a large prospective investigation funded by the British Heart Foundation and the Medical Research Council was led by Southall into the potential role of short episodes of absent breathing and heart rate and rhythm disorders in newborn infants. The study showed no evidence that these episodes in infants were related to subsequent SIDS leading to a major reversal of the role of apnoea monitors in SIDS prevention.

For his research work into SIDS, Southall was given The Mary Gray and William W Cobey Award from the Sudden Infant Death Syndrome Institute in 1994, University of Maryland and in January 1995 the Annenberg Center Apnea of Infancy Award.

In 1993, Southall reported in the British Medical Journal a study investigating the performance of invasive procedures in the intensive care of infants and children. This study revealed inadequate pain control and sedation for a high proportion of painful procedures and led to a national review of this problem. As a consequence he was appointed chair of a working party of the British Paediatric Association to develop guidelines on the management of pain control in children in hospital in the UK.

Between 1986 and 1994, Southall led a programme of diagnostic and treatment-based clinical work at the Royal Brompton Hospital in London, and the North Staffordshire Royal Infirmary in Stoke-on-Trent involving patients with unexplained life-threatening events from a wide area of the UK. This work, involving the police and social services departments, helped protect children from life-threatening episodes of Fabricated or Induced Illness (FII) mostly involving suspected intentional suffocation of infants and young children by one of their parents, usually the mother. Techniques included the controversial covert video surveillance (CVS) in hospital of infant and child patients by police or specially trained nursing staff to observe the interactions of their parents with the children. Surveillance revealed abuse in 33 of 39 suspected cases, with documentation of intentional suffocation observed in 30 patients. Poisonings (with disinfectant or anticonvulsant), a deliberate fracture, and other emotional and physical abuse were also identified under surveillance. Bleeding from the nose and/or mouth was reported in 11 of the 38 patients who had had episodes of near death and were undergoing CVS but in none of 46 controls. Four patients who had been subjected to recurrent suffocation before CVS suffered permanent neurologic deficits and/or required anticonvulsant therapy for epileptic seizures resulting from hypoxic cerebral injury. The 39 patients undergoing CVS had 41 siblings, 12 of whom had previously died suddenly and unexpectedly. Eleven of the deaths had been classified as sudden infant death syndrome (SIDS) but after CVS, four parents admitted to suffocating eight of these siblings. Other signs of serious abuse were documented in the medical, social, and police records of an additional 15 of the siblings. The project concluded in its report in the medical journal Pediatrics that “Induced illness is a severe form of abuse that may cause death or permanent neurologic impairment. It may be accompanied by other severe forms of abuse, may result in behavioural disorders, and may be accompanied by immeasurable suffering. Detection of this abuse requires careful history-taking; thorough examination of the health, social, and police records; and close and focused collaboration between hospital and community child health professionals, child psychiatrists, social workers, and police officers. Covert video surveillance (CVS) may help investigate suspicions and ensure that children are protected from additional abuse. When parents have failed to acknowledge that they have deceived health professionals, partnership with them in seeking to protect their children may be neither safe nor effective”.

The project attracted controversy for its methods and raised ethical implications. Critics argued that the desire of the implementers of CVS to observe the carers harming the children exposed the children to further abuse, that the betrayal of doctor-patient trust necessarily involved in the surveillance could cause harm to the subjects, and that "a diagnosis should lead to treatment, not punishment". However, Southall and his team argued that the surveillance saved the lives of many of the children involved, and Southall himself said that "By doing covert video surveillance we are betraying the trust of parents... but if a parent has been abusing his or her child in this way then the trust between child and parent has already gone."

The concerns of a campaigning group of parents accused of abuse, a small proportion of parents involved in the ventilator study described below and their advocates, including a woman who was imprisoned subsequently for conspiracy to abduct a child, led to an investigation of Southall's child protection work, in particular covert video surveillance, by his employer the North Staffordshire Hospital. The campaigning group called themselves MAMA (Mothers Against Munchausen syndrome by proxy Allegations). The investigation by his employing hospital cleared Southall.

In the early 1990s, Southall led a randomised controlled study which pioneered continuous negative extrathoracic pressure therapy (CNEP), a non-invasive treatment for breathing difficulties in infants and young children involving the application of negative pressure to the patients' chests. The technique was found to reduce the duration of chronic lung disease in premature newborn infants and to reduce the need for intensive care in infants with bronchiolitis, a common and dangerous chest infection. This study was criticised by the MAMA campaigning group described above, with some parents of the children involved suggesting that the treatment was linked to subsequent death or brain injury of their children. Based on these allegations, the research was also the subject of investigations by the North Staffordshire Hospital which again found no wrongdoing or harmful effects of the treatment. An independent follow-up study concluded in 2006 that there was "no evidence of disadvantage, in terms of long-term disability or psychological outcomes" from the use of the technique. The infants treated were all very premature babies in whom mortality and morbidity was expected, but there were no differences between study infants and control infants in this regard in the independent follow up study conducted. The long "saga" to discredit the researchers, perpetuated by constant media exposure, caused “widespread unpredictable damage”.

In November 2005, Southall retired from Keele University and his honorary status as professor there came to an end; they did not award him an emeritus professorship.

== General Medical Council Investigations ==
The same campaigning group (MAMA) also complained about the randomised controlled trial of CNEP to the General Medical Council (GMC) who many years later in 2008 investigated Southall and two colleagues at a fitness to practice hearing. The hearing was brought to a premature end when it was revealed that the evidence put forward by the campaigners was incorrect.

In 2004, following more complaints from the MAMA campaign and Mr Clark, Southall was found guilty of serious professional misconduct by the General Medical Council (GMC), after alleging to a police child protection officer that the husband of Sally Clark, a mother wrongly convicted of murdering two of her babies, was himself almost certainly responsible for murdering the couple's children. The children were later found to have died from natural causes based on withheld medical evidence Southall made the claim in confidence to a child protection officer of the Staffordshire police after watching a television documentary about the case as he was concerned about the safety of the surviving child. He subsequently presented his evidence to a formally convened child protection case conference, members of which expressed their view at a GMC hearing that his input was important. Despite this a GMC panel banned Southall from child protection work for three years. The Council for Healthcare Regulatory Excellence challenged the decision as insufficient and argued that he should be deregistered, but a High Court of Justice decision in 2005 held that the sanction was not unduly lenient. In the General Medical Council’s (GMC) subsequent publication: Protecting children and young people: the responsibilities of all doctors July 2012 and active 3 September 2012, there is the following statement: "You must tell an appropriate agency, such as your local authority children's services, the NSPCC or the police, promptly if you are concerned that a child or young person is at risk of, or is suffering, abuse or neglect unless it is not in their best interests to do so (see paragraphs 39 and 40). You do not need to be certain that the child or young person is at risk of significant harm to take this step. If a child or young person is at risk of, or is suffering, abuse or neglect, the possible consequences of not sharing relevant information will, in the overwhelming majority of cases, outweigh any harm that sharing your concerns with an appropriate agency might cause".

In February 2007, The Attorney-General Lord Goldsmith, following further campaigning by the MAMA group, announced that a review would be held into a number of criminal cases in which Southall had given evidence for the prosecution, following allegations that his hospital department had kept up to 4,450 separate case files containing specialist clinical data on child patients mainly referred from other hospitals and including some child protection cases. These were kept separate from the standard hospital records but with a link to them which was fully known by hospital administrators. This investigation revealed no evidence that Southall's actions had harmed criminal investigations.

On 4 December 2007, Southall was struck off the medical register after being found guilty of professional misconduct by the General Medical Council in another child protection case. Southall appealed against this decision in the High Court, but the appeal was dismissed. In his judgment, Mr. Justice Blake stated that Southall "had speculated on non-medical matters in an offensive manner entirely inconsistent with the status of an independent expert." However, this ruling was subsequently overturned by the Court of Appeal in 2010. Neither the GMC Panel nor Mr. Justice Blake understood the importance of the presence of an independent senior social worker during the interview with the mother who had brought the complaint to the GMC. The mother, who was part of the long-standing MAMA campaign against his child protection work described above, complained that Southall had accused her of murdering her son. Southall denied this. The senior social worker present and taking notes throughout the interview gave evidence that the mother’s allegation was incorrect and also denied that Southall had made the accusation.

On 1 June 2009 Southall was the subject of an episode of the BBC's current affairs programme Panorama, A Very Dangerous Doctor. This programme raised serious concerns about the way in which his child protection work had been investigated and damaged by the GMC and other inappropriate inquiries. The interest group 'Professionals Against Child Abuse' subsequently commented in the medical journal The Lancet that the "GMC should never have brought this case" (against Southall) and criticised disciplinary proceedings brought against other doctors involved in child protection work.

On 4 May 2010 Southall was back on the medical register after winning his action in the Court of Appeal ending a long-running dispute with the General Medical Council. The Appeal Court's decision meant that he was able to practice medicine again.

In September 2011 the GMC dropped its last remaining case against Southall involving the issue of the special case files raised by the campaigning group MAMA and Attorney General in 2007. Southall stated that this final closure of the GMC case in September 2011 was a "victory over an orchestrated and dangerous campaign which has waged war over 16 years against my work in trying to protect children from life threatening abuse". He continued to request that the GMC apologise for its misguided approach to his work and for breaching his right to a fair trial within a reasonable time.

== Work since 2011 ==
In 2011 Southall gave the annual David Harvey Lecture at the UK Neonatal Update at Imperial College London.

Southall was editor of a textbook, International Maternal & Child Health Care: A practical manual for hospitals worldwide, published by MCAI in 2014 and provided free of charge to frontline health workers in public hospitals in low income countries.

As of 2023, Southall continues to be a trustee of the MCAI.

== Honours and awards ==
Southall received an OBE in 1999 for services to childcare in Bosnia and Herzegovina.
