= Marcus Pembrey =

British clinical geneticist

Marcus Pembrey FMedSci
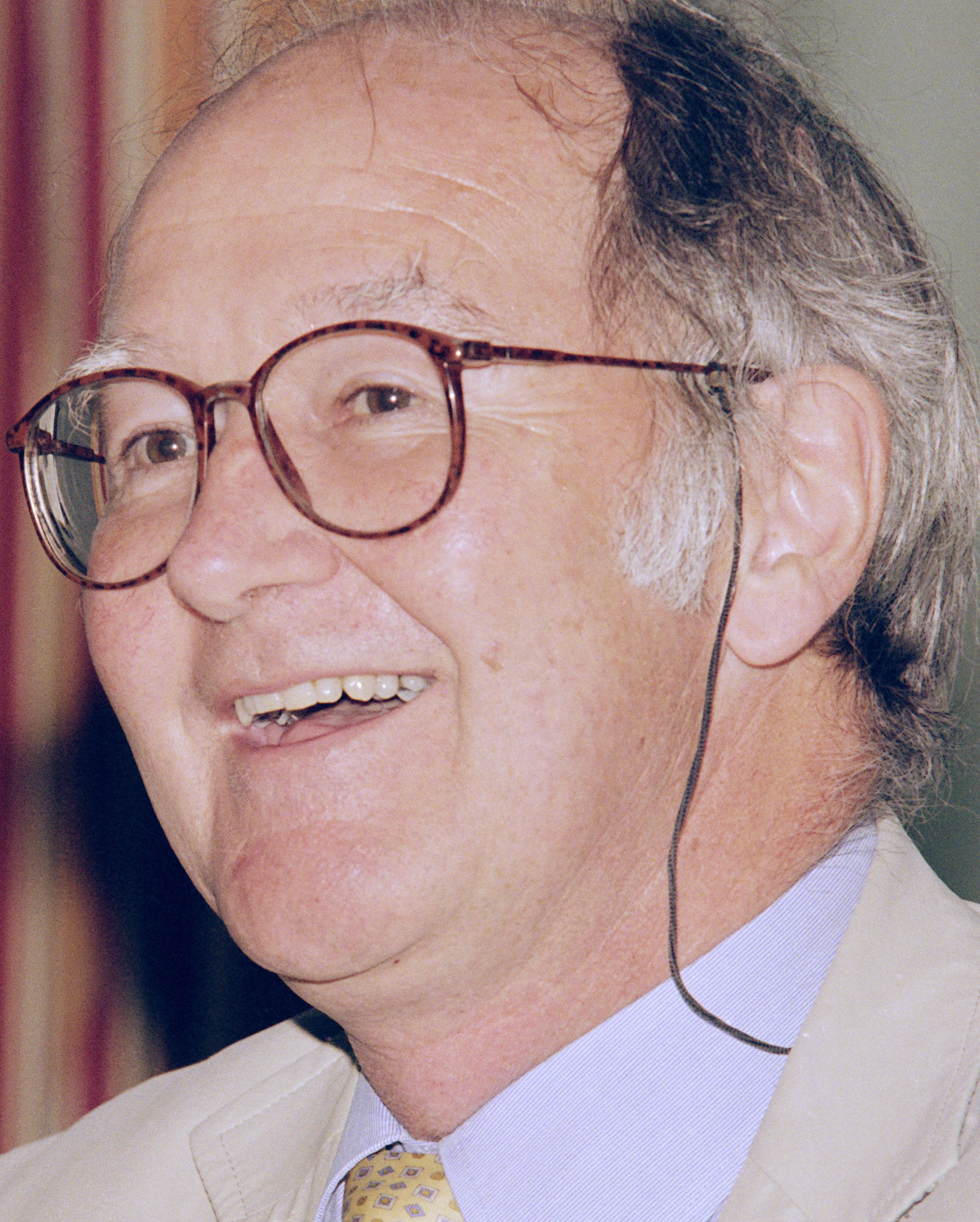
- Pembrey in July 2001
- Born: 20 April 1943 (age 83); Guildford, Surrey
- Occupation: Clinical geneticist

Marcus Edred Pembrey FMedSci (born 20 April 1943) is a British clinical geneticist with a research interest in non-Mendelian inheritance in humans. He is Emeritus Professor of Paediatric Genetics at UCL Great Ormond Street Institute of Child Health and Visiting Professor of Paediatric Genetics, University of Bristol. He featured in a 2005 Horizon program on BBC television called "the Ghost in Your Genes".

== Early life and education ==
Born into a medical family, Marcus Pembrey spent his childhood in Hurstpierpoint, Sussex, where his father was a general practitioner. The rural setting and his aunts' farm encouraged an interest in natural history. Educated at Hurstpierpoint College, he went to Guy's Hospital Medical School, London in 1960; with postgraduate research training at the Nuffield Unit of Medical Genetics, University of Liverpool 1969-71.

== Career and research ==
After further clinical training at Guy's Hospital, in 1979 he was appointed head of the new Mothercare Unit of Paediatric Genetics at the Institute of Child Health, London and Honorary consultant clinical geneticist at the Great Ormond Hospital for Children; posts he held until 1998. Made professor in 1986, he became Vice-Dean of the Institute of Child Health 1990 - 1998. He was instrumental in ensuring that the design of the Avon Longitudinal Study of Parents and Children ALSPAC included a genetic component.

Since 1979 his research has focused on non-Mendelian inheritance; first on the inheritance of fragile X syndrome for which he proposed a premutation in 1985. and then Angelman syndrome - an early example of genomic imprinting in humans. This latter research led in 1996 to a speculative paper on transgenerational modulation of gene expression. in which he refers to himself as a Neo-Lamarckian, a term he no longer uses.

Following Swedish studies demonstrating transgenerational effects of food supply, Pembrey collaborated with Lars Olov Bygren on research that featured in a 2005 Horizon program on BBC television called "The Ghost in Your Genes". The focus of his current research is environmental epigenomics and transgenerational responses, and he writes, speaks and broadcasts widely on this area for both expert and lay audiences. With Jean Golding he is closely involved in studies of intergenerational effects of environmental influences such as smoking and stress on child and adult development within the Avon Longitudinal Study of Parents and Children ALSPAC, of which he was Director of Genetics until 2006.

== Public engagement ==
Appointed Advisor in Genetics to the Chief Medical Officer, UK Government's Department of Health 1989-1998. President, European Society of Human Genetics(ESHG)1994-1995; Chair, ESHG Committee on Ethical Issues (renamed Public and Professional Policy Committee) 1994-1998; Co-founder and ESHG Liaison Officer, International Federation of Human Genetics Societies 1996-2001. Co-founder of Progress Educational Trust in 1992 and chairman of Trustees almost continuously until 2014. The Trust's mission is to educate and debate the responsible application of reproductive and genetic science.

Honours Honorary Doctor of Science (University of Bristol) July 2018.

== Personal life ==
He is married to Heather (née Burgess) with whom he has two children, Lucy and Adam, and five grandchildren.

== See also ==
- Edward J. Steele
- Marion J. Lamb
- Eva Jablonka
- Neo-Lamarckism
