= Martin Ward Platt =

British neonatologist (1954–2019)

Martin Peter Ward Platt (28 September 1954 – 27 July 2019) was a British neonatologist.

He was an expert witness for the prosecution of Angela Cannings, whose conviction was later overturned. He also gave evidence against Donna Anthony, whose conviction was later overturned.

He was involved in the prosecution case against Lucy Letby, and was due to be an expert witness at her trial, but died before he could give evidence.

== Early life ==
Born in Chester, Platt studied medicine at Bristol University.
