= Angela Cannings =

British woman, wrongfully convicted of murder

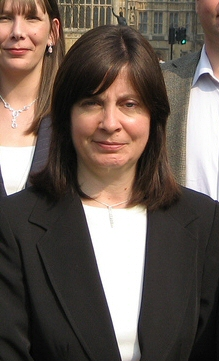
Angela Cannings outside the Palace of Westminster.

Angela Cannings was wrongfully convicted and sentenced to life imprisonment in the UK in 2002 for the murder of her seven-week-old son, Jason, who died in 1991, and of her 18-week-old son Matthew, who died in 1999. Her first child, Gemma, died of sudden infant death syndrome (SIDS) in 1989 at the age of 13 weeks, although she was never charged in connection with Gemma's death.

Her conviction was based on claims that she had smothered the children, but was overturned as unsafe by the Court of Appeal on 10 December 2003. Cannings was convicted after the testimony of Roy Meadow, a paediatrician who was later struck off, then reinstated, by the General Medical Council. Another expert witness for the prosecution was neonatologist Martin Ward Platt. Her defence solicitor was Bill Bache.

The Cannings case was re-examined after a BBC "Real Story" investigation showed that her paternal great-grandmother had suffered one sudden infant death and her paternal grandmother two. Michael Patton, a clinical geneticist at St George's Hospital Medical School, told the BBC that a genetic inheritance was the most likely explanation for the cot deaths in the family.

== Involvement of Roy Meadow ==
Expert witness Roy Meadow was later struck off the General Medical Council register partly as a result of his evidence at the Cannings trial. Meadow based his calculations on the likelihood of a second crib death being the same as the likelihood of a first, whereas in households where one crib death has taken place, the probability of another is greatly increased. He also asserted crib death implausible (which was contrary to the opinion of other specialists). Cannings later said Meadow should be "severely punished" for his testimony in her case and others. Meadow was later reinstated to the GMC on appeal, a judge ruling that his errors did not amount to serious professional misconduct.

== Other cases ==
The quashing of Cannings' conviction and other high-profile cases resulted in a review of 297 other cases where conviction relied on expert witness opinion. On 14 February 2006, Lord Goldsmith, the Attorney General, announced that three of these cases needed to be reconsidered by the courts.

== In popular culture ==
The trial of Angela Cannings was dramatised in the 2005 BBC film, Cherished, starring Sarah Lancashire as Angela and Timothy Spall as Terry Cannings.

== See also ==
- Maxine Robinson – UK serial killer mother exposed, with the assistance of Meadow, around the same time as Cannings and others in similar cases were freed, leading the judge to comment that the case was "a timely reminder that not all mothers in prison for killing their children are the victims of miscarriages of justice"
- Factitious disorder imposed on another ("Munchausen syndrome by proxy")
- Donna Anthony
- Sally Clark
- Sudden infant death syndrome
- Trupti Patel
