= Meadow's law =

Discredited concept in child-protection law

Meadow's Law is a now-discredited legal concept once used to adjudicate cases involving multiple instances of sudden infant death syndrome (SIDS), also known as crib or cot deaths, linked to a single caregiver. Due to the rarity and often inexplicable nature of these deaths, the law posited that "one sudden infant death is a tragedy, two is suspicious and three is murder until proved otherwise." Now recognized as fundamentally flawed and based on misunderstanding of statistics, Meadow's Law has been heavily criticized for leading to wrongful convictions and accusations.

== History ==
The concept was proposed by British paediatrician Roy Meadow, who until 2003 was seen by many as "Britain's most eminent paediatrician" and leading expert on child abuse. His reputation went into decline with a series of legal reverses for his theories, and in July 2005 he was struck off the medical register by the General Medical Council for tendering misleading evidence. His licence was reinstated in February 2006 by a London court.

Meadow attributed many unexplained infant deaths to the disorder or condition in mothers called Munchausen syndrome by proxy. According to this diagnosis, some parents, especially mothers, harm or even kill their children as a means of calling attention to themselves. Its existence has been confirmed by cases where parents have been caught on video surveillance actively harming their children, but its frequency is subject to debate as Meadow claimed to have destroyed the original data which he used to substantiate the law.

As a result of the 1993 trial of Beverley Allitt, a paediatric nurse convicted of killing four children under her care and injuring five others, Meadow's ideas gained ascendancy in British child protection circles, and mothers were convicted of murder on the basis of his expert testimony. Thousands of children were removed from their parents and taken into care or fostered out because they were deemed to be 'at risk'. From 2003, however, the tide of opinion turned: a number of high-profile acquittals cast doubt on the validity of 'Meadow's Law'. Several convictions were reversed, and many more came under review.

=== Attribution to the Di Maios ===
In a note to his mathematical analysis of the Sally Clark case, Professor Ray Hill endorses a claim that Meadow did not originate the rule:

Professor Meadow did not originate the law. It appears to be attributable to D. J. and V. J. M. Di Maio, two American pathologists who state in their book: It is the authors' opinion that while a second SIDS death from a mother is improbable, it is possible and she should be given the benefit of the doubt. A third case, in our opinion, is not possible and is a case of homicide. It is clear that the statement is the authors' opinion. It is not a conclusion reached by analysis of their observations; no supportive data are presented and there are no illustrative case histories, or references to earlier publications. This is in striking contrast with the rest of the book which is replete with illustrative case histories and cites many references throughout. A recent examination of Meadow's own contributions to the medical literature has likewise failed to uncover supportive pathological evidence or references to it

— Dr Glynn Walters, Letter to Professor Ray Hill, published in Multiple sudden infant deaths – coincidence or beyond coincidence?

The precept was published in the United States by DiMaio and DiMaio in 1989, without mention of Meadow.

The formula is "clearly fallacious" according to Bob Carpenter, Professor of Medical Statistics at the London School of Hygiene and Tropical Medicine, an expert witness in some of the trials where infant cot deaths were prosecuted as homicides.

== Criticisms ==
Critics of Meadow's law state that it is based on a fundamental misunderstanding of statistics, particularly relating to probability, likelihood, and statistical independence.

At the trial in 1999 of solicitor Sally Clark, accused of murdering her two sons, Meadow testified that the odds against two such deaths happening naturally was 73,000,000:1, a figure which he obtained by squaring the observed ratio of births to cot-deaths in affluent non-smoking families (approximately 8,500:1).

This caused an uproar among professional statisticians, whose criticisms were twofold:

=== The prosecutor's fallacy ===
Firstly, Meadow was accused of espousing the so-called prosecutor's fallacy in which the probability of "cause given effect" (i.e. the true likelihood of a suspect's innocence) is confused with that of "effect given cause" (the likelihood that innocence will result in the observed double-cot-death). In reality, these quantities can only be equated when the likelihood of the alternative hypothesis, in this case murder, is close to certainty. Since murder (and especially double murder) is itself a rare event, the probability of Clark's innocence was certainly far greater than Meadow's figure suggested.

An equivalent error is to accuse anybody who wins a lottery of fraud.

=== Statistical independence ===
The second criticism was that Meadow's calculation had assumed that cot deaths within a single family were statistically independent events, governed by a probability common to the entire affluent non-smoking population. No account had been taken of conditions specific to individual families (such as a hypothesised "cot death gene") which might make some more vulnerable than others. The occurrence of one cot-death makes it likely that such conditions exist, and the probability of subsequent deaths is therefore greater than the group average (estimates are mostly in the region of 1:100).

Combining these corrections with estimates of successive murder probabilities by affluent non-smokers, Mathematics Professor Ray Hill found that the probability of Clark's guilt could be as low as 10% (based solely on the fact of two unexplained child deaths, and before any other evidence was considered). In any case, a legal verdict is not to be rendered on the basis of statistics; Hill wrote, "guilt must be proved on the basis of forensic and other evidence and not on the basis of these statistics alone. My own personal view that she is innocent is based on my subjective assessment of all the aspects".

== See also ==
- Kathleen Folbigg
- Sally Clark
