= Donna Anthony =

British woman unjustly convicted and later cleared of the murder of her two babies

Donna Anthony is a British woman from Somerset who was jailed in 1998 after being convicted of the murder of her two babies. She was cleared and freed after having spent more than six years in prison.

She was one of several women at the centre of high-profile cases where evidence given by the controversial paediatrician Roy Meadow to convictions of mothers who reported more than one cot death. Martin Ward Platt also gave evidence.

Anthony's daughter died in February 1996, at the age of eleven months. Her four-month-old son died in March 1997. In November 1998, twenty-five-year-old Anthony was convicted of murder and sentenced to life imprisonment, following a trial in which it was suggested that she had smothered her son in order to get sympathy from her estranged husband. She made an unsuccessful appeal against her conviction in 2000.

In January 2003, the conviction of Sally Clark – jailed for life for the murder of her two sons – was quashed. In June that year, Trupti Patel was acquitted of murdering her babies. In December, Angela Cannings was cleared after spending more than a year in prison for the murder of her sons. The prosecution in all four cases had relied on evidence supplied by Roy Meadow, who said that the chances of two babies dying of natural causes within the same family were one in 73 million. Meadow's evidence was later discredited, and he was subsequently struck off by the General Medical Council (though he was reinstated on appeal). Following the overturning of Angela Cannings's conviction, twenty-eight cases, including that of Donna Anthony, were referred to the Criminal Cases Review Commission (CCRC), and Anthony was freed in April 2005.

== See also ==
- List of miscarriage of justice cases
- Sally Clark
- Maxine Robinson
