= Avon Longitudinal Study of Parents and Children =

Study started in 1991 in Bristol, England

- Established: 1991
- Director: Nic Timpson
- Location: Bristol
- Operating agency: University of Bristol
- Website: http://childrenofthe90s.ac.uk/

The Avon Longitudinal Study of Parents and Children (ALSPAC), also known as Children of the 90s and formerly the Avon Longitudinal Study of Pregnancy and Childhood, is a cohort study of children born in the former county of Avon, England during 1991 and 1992. It is used by researchers in health, education and other social science disciplines.

The study is hosted at the University of Bristol and was initially led by Jean Golding, then George Davey Smith.

The initial recruits were 15,247 pregnant women with estimated dates of delivery between April 1991 and December 1992. Since then the fathers, siblings and children of the participants have also begun to be studied and the study has launched Children of the Children of the 90s as a new generation is born.

It is one of a family of similar studies that were set up at around the same time in six countries across Europe, known as the European Longitudinal Study of Pregnancy and Childhood (ELSPAC). ELSPAC included studies in Czechoslovakia and the Isle of Man, in addition to ALSPAC.

As of 2025, data from the study has been used in over 3000 scientific papers.

== Liver disease ==
In the study, 2.5% of 4,000 people born in 1991 and 1992 were found by ultrasound scanning at the age of 18 to have non-alcoholic fatty liver disease; five years later transient elastography (fibroscan) found over 20% to have the fatty deposits on the liver of steatosis, indicating non-alcoholic fatty liver disease; half of those were classified as severe. The scans also found that 2.4% had the liver scarring of fibrosis, which can lead to cirrhosis.
