= Marilyn Stowe =

English family lawyer (born 1957)

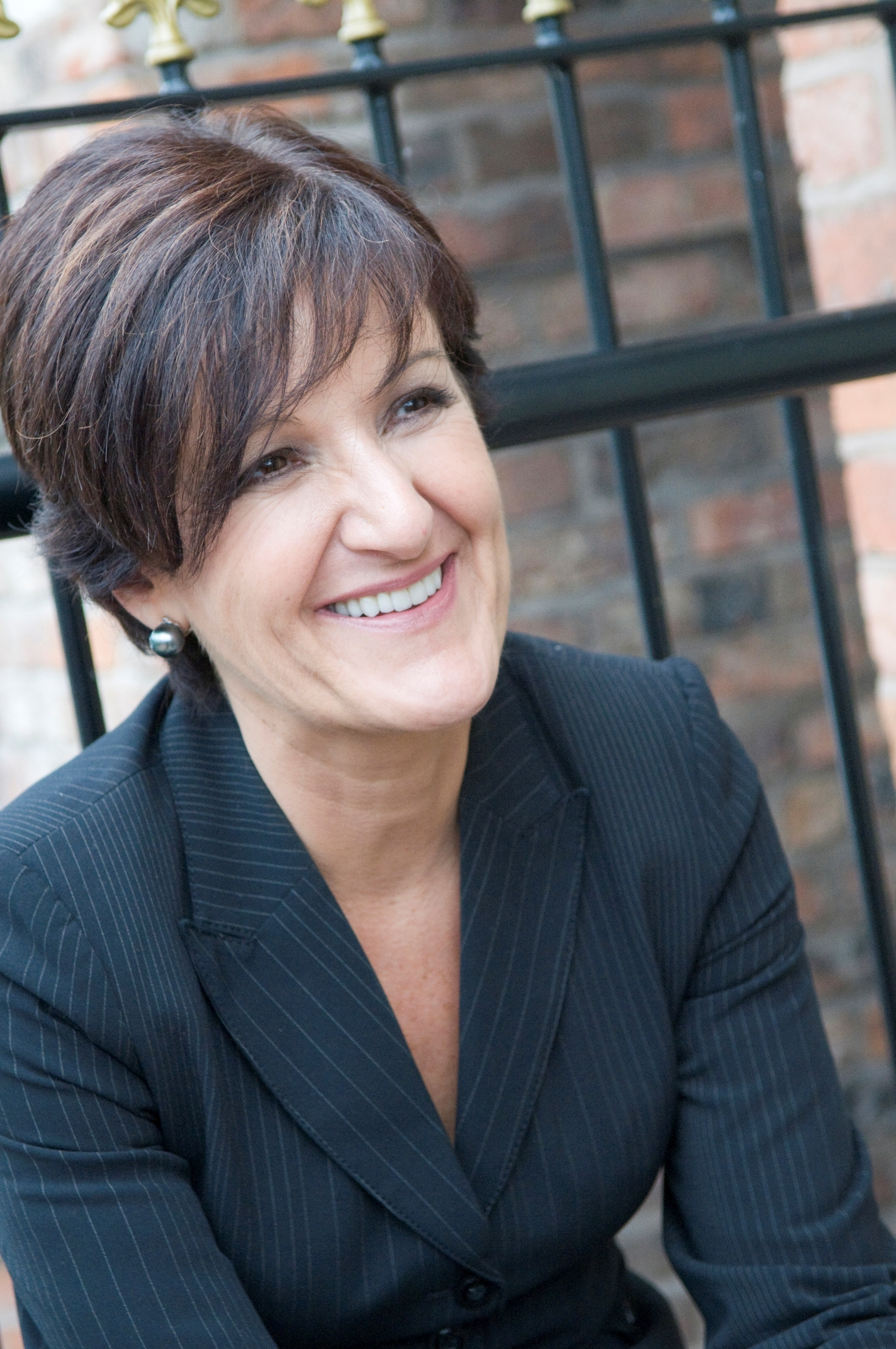
- Stowe in 2009
- Born: 1957 (age 68–69)
- Education: Leeds Girls High School, University of Leeds; Chester College of Law
- Partner: Grahame C Stowe

Marilyn Stowe (born 1957) is an English family lawyer. She founded her firm in a converted cobbler's shop in Halton, Leeds, England, in 1982. An attack by three masked men outside her office on 3 December 2003 led to the closure of her offices in Leeds, followed by a reopening in Harrogate, North Yorkshire. The success of this office inspired Stowe to open branches across the country, and she eventually grew the firm into the UK's largest family law specialist. In February 2017, she sold her firm and blog for a "substantial" eight figure sum to private equity investors Living Bridge. Her first clients were legally aided. Later, they included members of the aristocracy, and some of the wealthiest and best known figures in the UK and abroad.

== Life and career ==
Stowe attended the University of Leeds and lectured in English law at the University of Le Mans, France.

As a solicitor, she led the Law society’s Family Law Panel as its first Chief Assessor and Chief Examiner for six years from 1998. In 2007 and 2012, she was appointed to legal advisory groups working with the Law Commission, considering changes to family law in relation to cohabitation and finance in divorce. She became one of the UK's first family mediators in 1995 and one of the country's first Family Law arbitrators in 2012. In 2010, she was the first woman solicitor outside London elected a Fellow of the International Academy of Family Lawyers.

Working pro bono in her own time, Stowe uncovered previously undisclosed medical evidence, which proved critical in securing the release from prison of fellow solicitor Sally Clark, who had been jailed for life in 2001, following the sudden deaths of her two infant sons. A first appeal to the Court of Appeal had already failed but, "convinced something was wrong", Stowe volunteered her services and obtained the medical evidence that had not been produced at her original trial. This showed that the second baby had developed meningitis at the date of death. A second appeal based on this evidence was successful in 2003. The case led to revisions in civil and criminal procedure, an investigation into medical experts and the acquittal of several other women who had been imprisoned in similar circumstances.

The subject of women wrongly accused of murdering their babies was explored in the two-part documentary The Baby Killer Conspiracy, made by Caravan Media for Discovery Plus in 2021. This covered Stowe and the part she played in the case of Sally Clark.

In 2011, Stowe was invited to participate in an Oxford Union debate, and spoke in favour of the motion "This House believes that marriage is an outdated institution". She blogged for The Times and was the resident family lawyer on ITV show This Morning, for 18 months, answering legal questions phoned in by viewers. Stowe is the author of three books, including Divorce & Splitting Up: Advice from a top Divorce Lawyer, a guide to negotiating the legal issues in family breakdown.

In February 2017, Stowe sold her firm and blog to private equity investors Living Bridge and left the firm.

On 22 January 2019, to mark a unique business achievement in law, she opened trading at the London Stock Exchange at the launch of the global Jewish Women's Business Network, in the presence of Treasury Minister Liz Truss MP and other globally-based politicians and businesswomen. Following her retirement from family law, Stowe has turned her attention to philanthropy in the City of Leeds, particularly the Leeds Children’s Hospital and the refurbishment of the Oakwood Clock in Roundhay. In recognition of her successful legal career and philanthropy she was appointed Patron of St Gemma’s Hospice, Leeds, in 2019.

Stowe's unique contribution to English Law was recognised by HH Judge Barrington Black in his book The Jewish Contribution to English Law 1858 to Modern Times (Waterside Press 2021): She was listed as one of three top family law solicitors in the country, alongside Baroness Fiona Shackleton and Lady Helen Ward. Stowe is described as "bright, innovative and enterprising" and "a philanthropist aiding several needy organisations in Yorkshire".

Her name is one of those featured on the sculpture Ribbons, unveiled in 2024.

In September 2025, Stowe Family Law became one of the UK's Top 100 largest law firms, the first founded by and named after a woman to reach this milestone.

== Personal life ==
Stowe has been married to fellow solicitor Grahame Stowe, a part-time tribunal judge, for more than 30 years. Their son Benjamin Stowe is a family solicitor based in Central London.

== Publications ==
Stowe is the author of three books about life after divorce:

- 'Divorce - a New Beginning', published in 1993
- 'No Looking Back', published in 2002
- 'Divorce & Splitting Up: Advice From a Top Divorce Lawyer', first published in 2013.
