= Trupti Patel =

British pharmacist acquitted of murder

Trupti Patel is a British pharmacist from Maidenhead in Berkshire, England, who was acquitted in 2003 of murdering three of her children, Amar (5 September 1997 – 10 December 1997), Jamie (21 June 1999 – 6 July 1999), and Mia (14 May 2001 – 5 June 2001).

== Early life ==
Patel was born into a family of Punjabis who had moved from India to England. She spent her childhood in Lancashire, and attended grammar school. She attended King's College London, where she gained a B.Sc. in pharmacy. Around this time, she met her future husband, Jayant, a qualified electrical engineer who later worked as a business analyst for British Telecom. They were married within seven months, and their first child, a girl, was born in 1995.

== Charges and trial ==
Their second child, a boy, died unexpectedly at the age of two months, in December 1997. Eighteen months later, another boy died aged just 15 days. Autopsies yielded no explanations for the deaths, but a daughter who died at the age of 22 days in June 2001 was found to have four broken ribs. A police investigation was started, which led to Patel's arrest in May 2002. She was charged with the murder of the three children.

The case, which was heard at Reading Crown Court, was one of a number of famous court cases in Britain in which mothers who reported more than one cot death were accused of murder. It was one of a number of cases in which evidence was given by Roy Meadow, a controversial paediatrician whose testimony helped to falsely convict Sally Clark, Angela Cannings, and Donna Anthony of murdering their babies. Meadow's claim that the likelihood of two babies dying from natural causes in the same family was one in 73 million prompted the Royal Statistical Society to write a letter of complaint to the Lord Chancellor, stating that the figure had "no statistical basis"; other experts said that when genetic and environmental factors were taken into account, the figure was closer to one in 200.

Meadow, giving evidence for the prosecution, listed four indications of Patel's guilt. One was the injuries suffered by the third child to die. Patel's explanation was that the rib fractures had resulted from attempts at resuscitation. The second and third points were that the children had undergone several medical examinations, and all had been well until shortly before their deaths. The fourth point was that three consecutive children had died, and that, according to Meadow, "in general, sudden and unexpected death does not run in families."

One of the defence witnesses was genetics specialist Professor Michael Patton, who testified that several cot deaths in the same family could be caused by an undiscovered genetic defect, and that the chances of experiencing more than one cot death could be as high as one in twenty. The court heard evidence that Patel's maternal grandmother lost five children in infancy, but that her remaining seven children were "alive and well".

By the time the case came to court, Meadow's claims about the likelihood of a second cot death in the same family had been largely discredited. Clark's conviction for the murder of her sons had been overturned some months earlier, and Cannings's guilt was disputed by many. After the trial started, two key prosecution witnesses, both of whom examined Mia's body and disputed Patel's claim that the fractured ribs were caused by attempts at resuscitation, said that they were no longer sure. Professor Rupert Risdon, a paediatric pathologist, wrote to the judge saying that he had found evidence of rib fractures caused by resuscitation in three children that he had examined in the previous month alone, and Nathaniel Carey, a Home Office pathologist, said he could "no longer state categorically that the rib fractures were not due to resuscitation."

== Acquittal ==
On 11 June 2003, Patel was acquitted. She announced shortly after her acquittal that her husband would have a vasectomy, as they were unwilling to take the risk of having another child. A court order imposed on her after the death of Mia in 2001, requiring her to be supervised when with her remaining daughter, was being reassessed by social services in light of her acquittal.
