= Virginia Pascual =

Spanish-American pediatric rheumatologist

- Born: Madrid, Spain

Academic background
- Education: BSc, 1975, Centro de Estudios Universitarios; MD, 1981, Complutense University of Madrid

Academic work
- Institutions: Weill Cornell Graduate School of Medical Sciences; University of Texas Southwestern Medical Center

Maria Virginia Pascual is a Spanish-American pediatric rheumatologist.

== Early life and education ==
Pascual was born in Madrid, Spain but grew up in Ceuta. She earned her undergraduate degree from Centro de Estudios Universitarios in 1975 and her medical degree from the Complutense University of Madrid in 1981.

== Career ==
Pascual moved to the United States in 1987 to complete her postdoctoral fellowship in the Department of Microbiology at the University of Texas Southwestern Medical Center (UTSWMC). She remained at the institution as an associate professor of pediatrics and Director of the Pediatric Rheumatology Division until 2004. Eventually she became investigator at the Baylor Institute for Immunology Research. In 2001, her research team linked abnormal secretion of alpha interferon to the malfunctioning immune systems of young patients with lupus. In 2005 she described a link between Interleukin 1 and Systemic onset Juvenile Idiopathic Arthritis (sJIA) pathogenesis together with the first pilot trial results showing clinical efficacy of blocking this cytokine in sJIA patients.

As a pediatric rheumatologist, Pascual investigated pediatric inflammatory and autoimmune diseases with the goal of translating laboratory findings into therapeutic targets and useful biomarkers. In March 2016, she served as the principal investigator of a study that identified molecular subgroups of patients and could improve the design of clinical trials for systemic lupus erythematosus patients. The following year, she was appointed the founding Gale and Ira Drukier Director of the Gale and Ira Drukier Institute for Children’s Health at the Weill Cornell Graduate School of Medical Sciences. Pascual was also the recipient of the 2017 Lupus Insight Prize from the Lupus Research Alliance in recognition of her "major, novel insight and/or discovery with the promise of changing thinking about lupus as well as a high likelihood of generating further advances in the diagnosis and treatment of the disease."

In August 2018, Pascual was inducted into the Association of American Physicians as a "physician-scientists who has demonstrated excellence in the pursuit of medical knowledge and in the advancement of basic and clinical science discoveries and their application to clinical medicine." A few months later, her research team released a study suggesting that a previously unknown type of T lymphocyte causes the immune system to attack healthy tissues and organs and leads to chronic inflammation.

During the COVID-19 pandemic, Pascual was recognized with the Distinguished Basic/Translational Investigator Award from the American College of Rheumatology. She also received a grant supplement from the National Institute of Allergy and Infectious Diseases to study the differences in immune responses in children infected with SARS-CoV-2.
