= M v R =

Legal case in the High Court of Australia

M. v R
- Court: High Court of Australia
- Full case name: M v The Queen
- Decided: 13 December 1994
- Citations: [1994] HCA 63, 181 CLR 487

Court membership
- Judges sitting: Mason CJ, Brennan, Deane, Dawson, Toohey, Gaudron & McHugh JJ

Case opinions
- (4:3) appeal allowed even making full allowance for the manner in which (the accused and complainant) gave their evidence, the matters which cast doubt upon the prosecution case ... remain unanswered (per Mason CJ, Deane, Dawson, and Toohey JJ) partial concurrence appeal on intercourse counts ought be allowed, while the sexual assault counts ought be retried (per Gaudron J) dissenting no facts are present in this case that merit a court's assessment prevailing over the jury (per Brennan J) the correct test should be whether a reasonable jury must have had a reasonable doubt, this was not the case (per McHugh J)

M v R or M v The Queen is an Australian legal case decided in the High Court. It is an important authority in the field of criminal law, for the circumstances in which it is permissible for a jury's guilty verdict to be overturned by a judge. The case involved an appeal against criminal conviction by a father, against allegations of sexual assault and rape by his daughter. His appeal was allowed by majority.

== Background ==
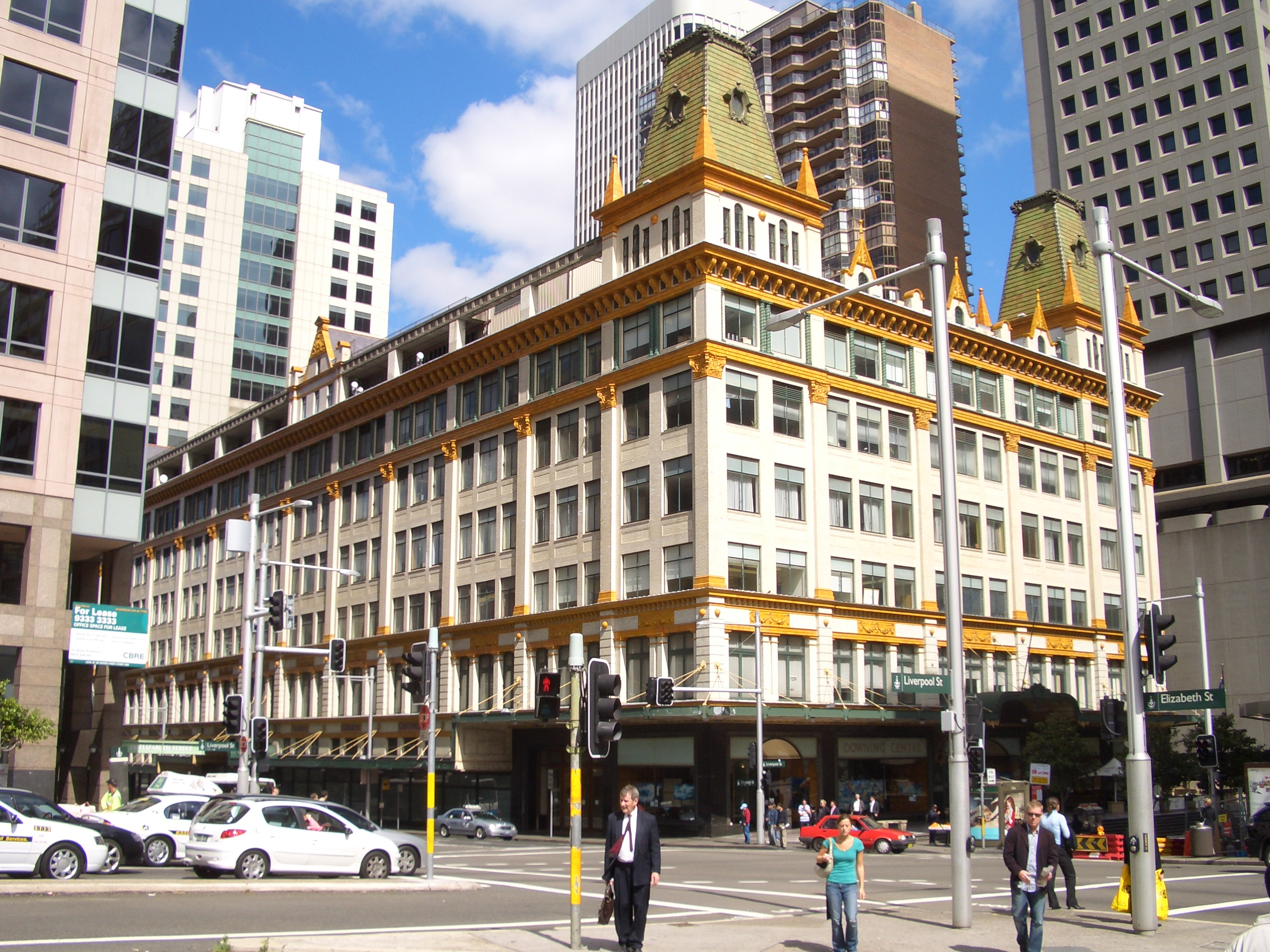
The District Court at the Downing Centre, in Sydney. 'M' was convicted by jury in that court

M was convicted in the District Court in Sydney. The counts found against him were two of indecent assault, and three of sexual intercourse. Each was allegedly committed against the complainant; one of his biological daughters. The daughter was 13 years old at the time of the alleged offending. An appeal against conviction was made to the Court of Criminal Appeal on the ground that his conviction was unsafe and unsatisfactory. That appeal was dismissed. Sully J, one of the three judges presiding, said of the appeal;

'For my own part, I would say at once that, were it permissible Kingdom, I would favour upholding the present appeal upon the ground now being discussed. I would take that view because, broadly speaking, I have in purely subjective terms a feeling of anxiety and discomfort about the verdicts of guilty that were returned against the present appellant'

The other two justices, Cripps JA and Finlay J, agreed with Sully J in dismissing the appeal; but dissociated themselves from his expressed feeling of anxiety or discomfort.

M was granted special leave to appeal his conviction at the High Court.

== Judgments ==
=== Majority judgement ===
==== Discussion of principle ====
The majority discussed at length previous judicial commentary on when it was appropriate, as a matter of law, for criminal appellate courts to overturn a conviction on the unsafe or unsatisfactory ground. This included a discussion of Lindy Chamberlain's unsuccessful appeal.

They found that the relevant question a court must ask itself, is whether; 'it thinks that upon the whole of the evidence it was open to the jury to be satisfied beyond reasonable doubt that the accused was guilty'. However, it also found that courts must have full regard to the jury's role as the primary body to be entrusted with a determination of guilt or innocence, and of the benefit jurors have in seeing and hearing from witnesses.

They then set out a description of what that evaluation entails;

"In most cases a doubt experienced by an appellate court will be a doubt which a jury ought also to have experienced. It is only where a jury's advantage in seeing and hearing the evidence is capable of resolving a doubt experienced by a court of criminal appeal, that the court may conclude that no miscarriage of justice occurred. That is to say, where the evidence lacks credibility for reasons which are not explained by the manner in which it was given, a reasonable doubt experienced by the court is a doubt which a reasonable jury ought to have experienced.

If the evidence, upon the record itself, contains discrepancies, displays inadequacies, is tainted or otherwise lacks probative force in such a way as to lead the court of criminal appeal to conclude that, even making full allowance for the advantages enjoyed by the jury, there is a significant possibility that an innocent person has been convicted, then the court is bound to act and to set aside a verdict based upon that evidence.

In doing so, the court is not substituting trial by a court of appeal for trial by jury, for the ultimate question must always be whether the court thinks that upon the whole of the evidence it was open to the jury to be satisfied beyond reasonable doubt that the accused was guilty. Although the propositions stated in the four preceding sentences have been variously expressed in judgments of members of the Court in previous cases, we have put aside those differences in expression in order to provide authoritative guidance to courts of criminal appeal by stating the propositions in the form in which they are set out above." - per Mason CJ, Deane, Dawson, Toohey, and Gaudron JJ

The majority made note of the anxiety and discomfort experienced by Sully J, saying it was indicative of a 'doubt (which) appears to have been engendered by shortcomings in the evidence, which are not met by reference to the jury's advantage in seeing the witnesses'. Sully J was therefore found to have made an error at law for having concluded that the appeal should be dismissed.

The principles outlined were then applied to the facts of the case.

==== Application to evidence ====
The prosecution called two medical practitioners to examine the complainant. The first found that the complainant's hymen was intact, and found this to be inconsistent with a rape by forced vaginal penetration. The second medical practitioner found there was no evidence 'one way or the other' of physical penetration. In cross-examination it became an issue that the complainant's account of the rape on Saturday 8 September 1990, included sitting and watching television with the appellant; as the complainant had claimed to have been watching a western movie. She was challenged by the defense that no such movie had been programmed for that evening. Similarly, the complainant testified that she had heard her mother watching tennis on the TV, on the night of the 22nd of September; although it was put to her in cross that no tennis was programmed for that night. Additionally, the appellant's wife testified that her bedroom was within hearing distance of the kitchen (she claimed to be cleaning the kitchen on the night of the 22nd); and her bed was squeaky. The complainant agreed in cross that the bed 'must have squeaked an awful lot when (her) father was attacking (her)'.

The complainant's evidence was found not to have been corroborated by anyone; and to have been contradicted by the first medical examiner. The month-long delay before the she made a complaint, and 'apparent equanimity' with which she was found to have conducted herself during the family barbecue the day following the alleged penetration on the 22nd; according to the court 'suggested the need for careful scrutiny of the allegations which she made against the appellant'.

The court also cast aspersions on the complainant's credibility for a complaint she had made to a medical registrar 2 years prior (when she was 11). In that complaint she had alleged that her younger half-sister (then 8 years old) had tormented her by touching her genital area in an aggressive manner. The majority decided that those accusations had 'revealed a capacity on the part of the complainant to make a complaint of a sexual nature to a person in authority about a member of her family'.

The appellant was found to have co-operated fully with the police investigation, and to have consistently denied the allegations against him. He gave evidence on oath denying the allegations, and was found to have not been discredited in 'any way' by cross-examination. Character evidence had been led on the appellant's behalf, including from people who had, with full knowledge of the allegations made against the complainant, permitted children to remain overnight at the appellant's home.

However, what the majority found most important to their acquittal was;

'the improbability of the appellant acting as he was alleged to have done in the circumstances prevailing on that night, namely, on a squeaky bed in an unlocked bedroom which was only a short distance from, and within hearing distance of, another bedroom occupied by the appellant's wife, in a fully occupied, small house'

In light of all of the evidence, it was found that:

'No doubt the jury believed the complainant and disbelieved the appellant and did so having seen and heard them both. But even making full allowance for the manner in which both gave their evidence, the matters which cast doubt upon the prosecution case, to which we have referred, remain unanswered.'

For that reason the majority jointly decided to allow the appeal.

== Significance ==
M. v R is one of the most cited cases in Australian law, as it is binding authority for the nature of assessment that criminal appeals courts must undertake for the unsafe and unsatisfactory ground of appeal. As of September 2020, M v R is the 22nd most cited High Court case, according to LawCite.

== See also ==
- Unsafe verdict
- Dietrich v The Queen
- Pell v R
- Chamberlain v R
