= Patricia Stallings =

American woman wrongfully convicted of murdering her son

Patricia Stallings (born 1964 or 1965) is an American woman who was wrongfully convicted of murder after the death of her son Ryan on September 7, 1989. Because testing seemed to indicate an elevated level of ethylene glycol in Ryan's blood, authorities suspected antifreeze poisoning, and arrested Stallings the next day. She was convicted of murder in early 1991, and sentenced to life in prison.

Stallings gave birth to another child while incarcerated awaiting trial; this next child was diagnosed with methylmalonic acidemia (MMA), a rare genetic disorder that can mimic antifreeze poisoning. Prosecutors initially did not believe that the sibling's diagnosis had anything to do with Ryan's case. Stallings' lawyer was forbidden from producing available evidence as proof of the possibility. After a professor in biochemistry and molecular biology had some of Ryan's blood samples tested, he was able to prove that the child had also died from MMA, and not from ethylene glycol poisoning. Test samples were sent to several commercial labs that used the same method as used on Ryan's sample. Nearly half of the test results were incorrect.

After spending nearly two years incarcerated, Stallings was released in July 1991. Prosecutors decided to close the case two months later. Stallings sued the hospital and laboratories that were involved in Ryan's care and reached an out-of-court settlement.

== Background ==
Stallings lived in Jefferson County, Missouri, and was a convenience store clerk in the mid-1980s. David Stallings frequently came into her store. They began to date in 1986, and married in 1988. Their first son, Ryan, was born in April 1989. Patricia took Ryan to Cardinal Glennon Children's Hospital in early July 1989. He was experiencing vomiting and difficulty breathing, and was admitted to the pediatric intensive care unit.

Noting a high level of what they then believed to be ethylene glycol in the baby's blood, physicians suspected that the boy had been poisoned with antifreeze. The infant was placed in protective custody. On August 31 of that year, Stallings was allowed a short visit with her son. Ryan's illness seemed to recur 4 days after the visit, and Stallings was arrested on assault charges on September 5. Ryan was treated for ethylene glycol poisoning but died two days later. The charges were revised to first-degree murder.

== Investigation and legal proceedings ==
While she was in jail awaiting trial, Stallings gave birth to another son, David Jr., on February 17, 1990. He was placed in foster care, but in March, he developed symptoms similar to those that had affected Ryan, despite having no contact with Stallings. He was diagnosed with methylmalonic acidemia (MMA), a genetic condition in which the body produces propionic acid, a compound that differs from ethylene glycol by one carbon atom. David Jr. recovered and was returned to foster care.

In May 1990, defense attorney Eric Rathbone obtained copies of notes determined to have been written by assistant prosecutor John S. Appelbaum. The notes indicated that the doctor who pronounced Ryan dead had considered the possibility of an MMA diagnosis, but also that he had not tested Ryan for it at the time. After the discovery of the note, prosecutors said that they believed that there were important differences between ethylene glycol and propylene glycol, and they said that even if Ryan had had MMA, they thought that he had also been poisoned.

During the investigation and ensuing trial, Stallings's defense attorney wanted to introduce the theory that Ryan had died of MMA, but the prosecutor, George B. McElroy, considered the sibling's diagnosis irrelevant to Ryan's death and the judge, Gary Kramer, would not allow him to advance the theory without any evidence that Ryan was actually affected by MMA. Stallings wanted her attorney to call character witnesses to testify on her behalf, but he did not do so. She was convicted of first-degree murder on January 31, 1991 and given a life sentence.

The Stallings case was featured on the Unsolved Mysteries television program in May 1991, and biochemist William Sly of Saint Louis University saw the episode. He agreed to test Ryan's blood, and gave it to James Shoemaker, M.D., Ph.D., Director of the Metabolic Screening Lab at St Louis University. Shoemaker immediately confirmed that Ryan had MMA. However, ethylene glycol is not a human metabolite, even in cases of MMA, and Stallings had gone to trial with no explanation linking MMA to ethylene glycol. After the trial, Shoemaker asked prosecutor George McElroy for the methods that had been used to measure ethylene glycol in Ryan's blood, and McElroy supplied that information. When the method was used on blood from Ryan and David Jr., it was seen that propionic acid, which is produced in MMA, caused a result that careless observers might mistake for ethylene glycol. Shoemaker then sent samples of propionate-spiked blood to several laboratories, who tested it with the same methods used in the Stallings case. Some of the laboratories came to the incorrect conclusion that the blood reflected ethylene glycol poisoning. At Sly's and Shoemaker's request, Piero Rinaldo of Yale University also looked at the case and concluded that Ryan had died of MMA. His testimony helped to convince McElroy that Ryan might not have been poisoned.

In July 1991, Stallings was released from jail pending a new trial. She was placed on house arrest. In September 1991, prosecutors apologized to Stallings and dropped the case against her.

== Aftermath ==
Stallings said that she lost a lot of weight due to the stress of being imprisoned. She said that her Buddhist faith helped to keep her strong during that time.

In 1993, Stallings won a seven-figure settlement against Cardinal Glennon Children's Hospital and the laboratory that tested Ryan's blood. She later said that the perception of her case may have been influenced by the case of Paula Sims, which had unfolded around the same time. In that case, a mother had been tried and convicted of killing her two daughters, and there was considerable public outcry over the murders.

In 1994, McElroy ran for reelection as Jefferson County prosecutor, and Stallings donated $10,000 to his opponent, Robert Wilkins. Wilkins won the race. When McElroy offered to show Wilkins his information on the Stallings case, Stallings found out and asked a court to have her arrest record expunged. Some of the information was ordered to be expunged, but a judge said that Missouri law mandated that prosecutors confidentially maintain some of the information related to felony arrests.

The Stallings case continues to be cited as an extreme case of a metabolic disorder that mimics a criminal act.

David Jr., known as "DJ", died in 2013, age 23.

Patricia and her husband, David, divorced in the 1990s. David later died in 2019 at age 57, following a long illness.

== See also ==
- List of wrongful convictions in the United States
- Sally Clark
- Betty Tyson
