= Paediatric and Perinatal Epidemiology =

- Discipline: Epidemiology, perinatology, paediatrics
- Language: English
- Edited by: Cande V. Ananth

Publication details
- History: 1987-present
- Publisher: Wiley-Blackwell
- Frequency: Bimonthly
- Impact factor: 3.980 (2020)

Standard abbreviations
- ISO 4: Paediatr. Perinat. Epidemiol.

Indexing
- ISSN: 0269-5022 (print); 1365-3016 (web)
- LCCN: sn87026363
- OCLC no.: 299336086

Links
- Journal homepage; Online access; Online archive

Paediatric and Perinatal Epidemiology is a bimonthly peer-reviewed medical journal covering epidemiologic research related to paediatrics and perinatology. It was established in 1987 by Jean Golding, who remained editor-in-chief until 2012 and is published by Wiley-Blackwell. Following Jean Golding, the position of editor-in-chief was taken up by Cande V. Ananth of the Columbia University Medical Center. The journal is affiliated with the Society for Pediatric and Perinatal Epidemiologic Research.

According to the Journal Citation Reports, the journal has a 2020 impact factor of 3.980.
