= Unsafe verdict =

Legal concept

In the context of a jury trial, the term unsafe verdict refers to a judicial finding that a jury's guilty verdict should be overturned.

Unsafe in this context means that the verdict or conviction was not based on reliable evidence and is likely to constitute a miscarriage of justice.

In most common law jurisdictions, people convicted at jury trial are allowed to have the evidence and transcript of their trial reviewed by an appellate court.

Verdicts can be found to be unsafe for either legal or factual reasons.

== Unsafe verdicts by jurisdiction ==
=== Australia ===
Criminal appeals made on the ground that the jury's guilty verdict was unsafe and unsatisfactory have been some of the most controversial legal cases in Australia. Both the Lindy Chamberlain case, as well as the appeal that led to the acquittal of George Pell were appeals made on the unsafe verdict ground before the High Court.

Authoritative cases on the unsafe verdict ground in Australia include M v The Queen, and Pell v The Queen. The currently applied test is whether the guilty verdict was "open to the jury" to be satisfied of the accused's guilt beyond reasonable doubt. A finding of guilt by the jury will only be disturbed if the court makes a finding that the guilty verdict was not open to the jury.

=== England and Wales ===
Opportunities for appealing in criminal cases were limited in criminal cases until the 20th century. However, unsafe verdicts are now an established ground of appeal for criminal cases in England and Wales. A prominent case in which this appeal ground has been cited in the UK, was in the appeal hearing regarding the rape conviction of Alex Hepburn.

== See also ==
- Court of Appeal (England and Wales)
- Appeals from the Crown Court (England and Wales)
- M v R
