= Overturned convictions in Canada =

This is a list of notable overturned convictions in Canada.

== Arturo Sanchez ==
Arturo Sanchez was an 81-year-old retired Canadian paediatrician with minor cognitive impairment when six former adult female patients emerged in 2015 to accuse him of sexually abusing them decades ago. Only two of the six accusers were deemed credible by the trial judge. The first woman claimed that when she was in hospital as a teenager in the 1960s she awoke in her bed to find Sanchez touching her. The second woman claimed he touched her breast while in her home to give her an allergy shot in 1980 when she was 11 years old. The trial judge believed the two women and convicted Sanchez on the basis of having the opportunity to access children, and that they said they told someone else it happened. Sanchez's convictions were overturned by an appeal panel when they concluded that the trial judge made significant and repetitive errors in assessing the evidence and coming to questionable conclusions not supported by the evidence when convicting Sanchez.

== Bo Zou ==
Bo Zou is a Toronto fashion photographer who was convicted of sexually assaulting a model that came to his condo for a photo shoot in July 2012. Zou's defence was that she had made advances on him but he rebuffed her and then he sent her home in a taxi. The next day the woman sent an anonymous email to the Toronto Police Service claiming Zou sexually assaulted her and provided them with his name and address. Zou was charged and the case went to trial. The trial judge convicted Zou on the basis that the woman's anonymous email corroborated her testimony (her only evidence) at trial. Zou appealed his conviction and it was overturned in 2017. The appeal panel concluded the trial judge misapplied the law and, "That word [corroboration], as commonly understood, refers to evidence from a source other than the witness."

== Timothy Houlahan ==
Timothy Houlahan was the co-defendant of Kyle Unger. He was convicted in 1992 of the June 1990 murder of 16-year-old Brigitte Grenier. RCMP officers operated in a sting operation where they obtained Unger's confession in which he implicated Houlahan. Both men were convicted based on Unger's confession and sentenced to life in prison. In 1994, Houlahan's conviction was overturned and a new trial was ordered. After his release, Houlahan died by suicide.

== James Sauvé and Richard Trudel ==
James Sauvé and Richard Trudel were convicted in 1996 of the 1990 murder of a man and his pregnant wife in Cumberland, Ontario. Their trial was the longest in Canadian history, lasting 16 months. In 2004, their convictions were overturned on appeal and a retrial was ordered. The charges were stayed on January 12, 2007, and the men were released.

== Richard Mallory and Robert Stewart ==
Richard Mallory and Robert Stewart were convicted in February 2000 of the January 16, 1990 murder of a man and his pregnant wife in Cumberland, Ontario. Their convictions were overturned on appeal and a retrial was ordered on January 12, 2007. They were released on February 27, 2007.

== Peter Chenier and George Farley ==
Peter Chenier and George Farley were convicted in 2001 of a 1997 murder based on the testimony of two other men. Chenier and Farley were sentenced to life in prison. In 2006, the Ontario Court of Appeals overturned the convictions and ordered a new trial. On July 18, 2008, they were acquitted after a retrial.

== Wilson Nepoose ==
Wilson Nepoose was convicted of murder in 1987. The Alberta Court of Appeals reversed his conviction in 1992. Nepoose was preparing a civil suit against the Canadian Department of Corrections and the RCMP when he was reported missing, and his skeletal remains were found in January 1998.

== Connie Oakes ==
Connie Oakes was convicted in November 2013 of second-degree murder in the stabbing death of Casey Armstrong in Medicine Hat, Alberta in May 2011. Following a two-week trial, Oakes was sentenced to life in prison with a 14-year minimum before parole eligibility. On April 6, 2016, the Alberta Court of Appeals overturned Oakes' conviction and ordered a new trial. On April 28, 2016, Oakes was released from the Edmonton Institution for Women.

== Gregory Parsons ==
Gregory Parsons was convicted in 1994 of murdering his mother, Catherine Carroll, and sentenced to life imprisonment. After 68 days in prison, Parsons was released on bail pending resolution of his appeal. Prior to his retrial, DNA testing excluded him as the killer and the Newfoundland Supreme Court entered a verdict of acquittal in November 1998. In March 2002, he was awarded $650,000 in compensation by the Government of Newfoundland. In November 2002, Parsons' childhood friend, Brian Doyle pleaded guilty to the second-degree murder of Catherine Carroll. In September 2005, Parsons was awarded an additional $650,000 by the Government of Newfoundland.

== Benoit Proulx ==
Benoit Proulx was convicted in 1991 for the murder of his ex-girlfriend and he was sentenced to life imprisonment. He was acquitted by the Quebec Court of Appeals in 1992 and awarded $1.1 million in compensation by the Government of Quebec in 2001.

== Gary Staples ==
Gary Staples was convicted in 1970 of murdering a taxi driver in Hamilton, Ontario in 1969. Staples' conviction was based on the testimony of his ex-girlfriend who testified in exchange for leniency on robbery charges. He was acquitted after his second trial in 1972. In 2002, Staples was officially cleared of the murder and he was awarded an undisclosed amount in compensation.

== Steven Truscott ==
Steven Truscott was convicted on September 30, 1959, of the rape and murder of a 12-year-old girl. 14-year-old Truscott was tried as an adult and after his conviction, he was the youngest person in Canadian history to be sentenced to death. His sentence was eventually commuted to life imprisonment. Based on new evidence casting doubt on the reliability of his conviction, the Ontario Court of Appeals acquitted Truscott on August 28, 2007. On July 7, 2008, Truscott was compensated with $6.5 million. Additional compensation of $100,000 was awarded to Truscott's wife, Marlene, for pain and suffering.

== Dennis Oland ==
Dennis Oland was convicted in 2015 for the murder of his father in New Brunswick. He was acquitted on July 19, 2019, after his retrial.

== Chris McCullough ==
Chris McCullough was convicted in 1991 for the 1989 murder of a female school teacher. His conviction was quashed in January 2000 by the Ontario Court of Appeals after he was excluded by DNA tests of crime scene evidence. McCullough filed a $7.6 million malicious prosecution lawsuit in December 2000, which was stayed indefinitely in February 2003.

== Byron Hunter ==
Byron Hunter was convicted in 2002 of beating a man to death in 2000 with a baseball bat. His conviction was quashed in 2004, and the prosecution opted to drop the charges.

== Peter Frumusa ==
Peter Frumusa was convicted in 1989 of murdering a Niagara Falls, Ontario couple. The Ontario Court of Appeals ordered a new trial in 1996 and charges were dropped in June 1998.

== Donald Dodd ==
Donald Dodd was convicted in June 2012 of second-degree murder in Ontario. Dodd was sentenced to life in prison with a minimum of 17 years before parole eligibility. On April 27, 2015, the Ontario Court of Appeals quashed Dodd's conviction.

== Dimitre Dimitrov ==
Dimitre Dimitrov was convicted in 1999 of murdering his landlord in 1996. His conviction was quashed in 2003 and a retrial was ordered. Dimitrov was acquitted after his retrial in October 2005.

== Christopher Michael Burr ==
Christopher Michael Burr was convicted on December 4, 2014, of second-degree murder in the shooting death of Duane Laybourne in Calgary, Alberta on February 3, 2013. In April 2015, Alberta's Court of Appeal quashed Burr's conviction and ordered a retrial as the judge prejudicially erred by failing to instruct the jury to consider that Burr acted in self-defense. Alberta Justice filed a motion to stay the charges which was granted on July 20, 2016, and Burr was released later that day.

== Glen Assoun ==
Glen Assoun was convicted in 1999 for the murder of Brenda Way in Halifax, Nova Scotia in 1995. Assoun was sentenced to life in prison. He was acquitted on March 1, 2019, after a retrial in the Nova Scotia Supreme Court, during which the prosecution presented no evidence against Assoun. Assoun died in 2023 at the age of 67.

== Gordon Folland ==
George Folland was convicted in 1995 for the rape of an acquaintance. He was released in 1998 and his conviction was overturned in 1999 after DNA testing identified another man as the perpetrator. He was awarded an undisclosed amount in compensation by the Government of Ontario in 2006.

== Randy Druken ==
Randy Druken was convicted in 1995 for the murder of his girlfriend, Brenda Young. His conviction was overturned after a key witness, a jailhouse informant, recanted his story claiming that police had bullied him into making a false statement. Evidence came to light in 1998 that Randy's brother, Paul, was the actual murderer. In March 2003, the government of Newfoundland and Labrador asked the retired chief justice of Canada Antonio Lamer to head an inquiry into several wrongful convictions in Newfoundland including that of Druken. In December 2006, Randy was awarded $2.1 million CAD by the Newfoundland and Labrador government. Randy passed away on Dec. 25, 2022 at the age of 57.

== Ron Dalton ==
Ron Dalton was convicted on December 15, 1989, for the murder of his wife, Brenda. He was found guilty of second-degree murder and sentenced to life imprisonment with no possibility of parole for ten years. It was 12 years until Ron was proven innocent.

== Erin Walsh ==
On August 12, 1975, Erin Walsh was charged with acquaintance, Melvin "CheChe" Peters', murder. Erin was convicted of the second-degree murder of CheChe on October 17, 1975, and sentenced to ten years in prison. On March 14, 2008, the New Brunswick Court of Appeal quashed Erin's conviction and entered an acquittal. He died in October 2010 after a four-year battle with colon cancer.

== Kyle Unger ==
On February 28, 1992, Kyle Unger and Timothy Houlahan were convicted of the first-degree murder of classmate, Brigitte Grenier. After years of appeals, on November 4, 2004, Kyle was granted bail pending the decision of the Minister of Justice. On October 23, 2009, Manitoba's Deputy Attorney General formally withdrew charges and asked that he be officially acquitted.

== Sherry Sherrett-Robinson ==
On March 27, 1996, Sherry Sherret-Robinson was arrested and charged with the death of her four-month-old son, Joshua. Joshua's autopsy had been performed by the now disgraced forensic pathologist, Charles Smith, who believed that Joshua had been smothered to death. On June 2, 1999, Sherry was found guilty of infanticide and sentenced to one year in prison. On December 7, 2009, the Ontario Court of Appeal overturned Sherry's conviction and entered an acquittal.

== John (Jack) Salmon ==
John Salmon was convicted for the manslaughter death of his wife, Maxine, on March 5, 1971, and sentenced to ten years' imprisonment. On Monday June 22, 2015, the Ontario Court of Appeal admitted fresh evidence which absolved John, quashed his manslaughter conviction, and entered an acquittal.

== Tammy Marquardt ==
Tammy Marquardt was arrested and charged with the second-degree murder of her son, Kenneth, on November 23, 1993. Kenneth's autopsy had been performed by the now disgraced forensic pathologist, Charles Smith, who testified that Kenneth's cause of death was asphyxia and he had likely been strangled or smothered. On October 24, 1995, Tammy was convicted of Kenneth's murder and sentenced to life in prison without the possibility of parole for 10 years. On June 7, 2011, the Ontario Court of Appeal quashed Tammy's conviction and ordered a new trial. However, the Crown decided not to further pursue charges against her.

== Dinesh Kumar ==
Dinesh Kumar was arrested and charged with the second-degree murder of his son Gaurov, on June 26, 1992. Gaurov's autopsy had been conducted by the now disgraced forensic pathologist, Charles Smith, who claimed that Gaurov was a victim of shaken baby syndrome. On December 3, 1992, Dinesh pled guilty to criminal negligence causing his son's death and he was sentenced to 90 days imprisonment and two years probation. On January 20, 2011, the Ontario Court of Appeal set aside Dinesh's guilty plea and entered an acquittal.

== Clayton Johnson ==
Clayton Johnson was arrested and charged with the first-degree murder of his wife, Janice, in April 1992. On May 4, 1993, he was found guilty and incarcerated at Renous Penitentiary. On February 18, 2002, the Nova Scotia Court of Appeal quashed Johnson's conviction and ordered a new trial that would include the new evidence. However, the Crown decided not to proceed with a new trial and Johnson was released.

== Leighton Hay ==
Leighton Hay was arrested on July 6, 2002, for a shooting at the HHMS Nightclub in Scarborough, Ontario. He was identified by eyewitness Leisa Maillard, who gave an 80% estimate of her accuracy. Both he and Gary Eunick were convicted of first-degree murder. On November 28, 2014, the Crown withdrew the first-degree murder charge and Leighton was released.

== Richard Brant ==
Richard Brant was arrested and charged with manslaughter for the death of his son Dustin, on April 22, 1993. Dustin's autopsy was conducted by the now disgraced forensic pathologist, Charles Smith, who claimed that Dustin was a victim of shaken baby syndrome. On April 21, 1995, Richard pled guilty to aggravated assault and was sentenced to six months in prison. On May 4, 2011, the Ontario Court of Appeal set aside Richard's guilty plea and entered an acquittal instead.

== O'Neill Blackett ==
O'Neill Blackett was arrested on February 10, 1999, for the murder of his friend's 13-month-old daughter, Tamara. The now disgraced forensic pathologist, Charles Smith, maintained that Tamara had died due to strangulation or blunt force trauma. Due to Smith's testimony and Blackett's fear that he would face extensive time, he accepted a manslaughter plea in August 2001. Finally, on October 2, 2018, Blackett's name was cleared.

== Maria Shepherd ==
Maria Shepherd was charged with the death of her three-and-a-half-year-old step-daughter, Kasandra, on April 24, 1991. Kasandra's autopsy was conducted by the now disgraced forensic pathologist, Charles Smith. He claimed that she died as a result of abuse, involving a blow or blows to the head. On October 22, 1992, Maria was sentenced to two years in prison. The Ontario Court of Appeal quashed Maria's manslaughter conviction and entered an acquittal instead on February 29, 2016.

== Robert Baltovich ==
Robert Baltovich was convicted in March 1992 of the murder of his girlfriend, Elizabeth Bain, and he was sentenced to life in prison with no eligibility for parole for the next 17 years. Bain disappeared on June 19, 1990, after telling her mother she was going to "check the tennis schedule" on campus. On June 22, her car was found with a large bloodstain in the back seat, but her body was never found.

Baltovich consistently maintained his innocence throughout the trial and his lawyers suggested that the so-called "Scarborough Rapist", who was later identified as serial killer and rapist Paul Bernardo, might be responsible for the murder. He was nonetheless convicted and served eight years in prison until Baltovich's lawyers appealed, after which Baltovich was released on bail in March 2000. In December 2004, the Court of Appeal for Ontario set aside the conviction. In 2005, Ontario's Ministry of the Attorney-General announced that Baltovich would face a new trial on charges of second-degree murder, at an unspecified date, but the trial never took place. With no Crown case, the judge directed the jury to make a finding of not guilty on April 22, 2008.

== James Driskell ==
James Driskell was convicted for the first-degree murder of Perry Harder on June 14, 1991, and sentenced to life in prison with no parole eligibility for 25 years. Perry Harder's remains were found in a shallow grave outside Winnipeg, three months after his disappearance. Driskell was linked to the crime with three hairs found in his van that supposedly belonged to Harder, but DNA tests years later found that the hairs did not belong to the victim.

Driskell was released from prison on November 28, 2003, after spending 13 years in prison. In 2005, Minister of Justice and Attorney General of Canada Irwin Cotler used a special Criminal Code of Canada provision to quash the conviction, stay the charges, and order a new trial for Driskell, but the Manitoba Department of Justice decided not to order a new trial. It instead entered a stay of proceedings and called for a public inquiry, ending Driskell's conviction without exonerating him.

== Anthony Hanemaayer ==
Anthony Hanemaayer, then 19, was charged for breaking and entering, and alleged assault with a weapon against a 15-year-old girl at her home in Scarborough on September 29, 1987. During the trial in 1989, the Crown decided to withdraw the assault charges, however Hanemaayer was still convicted and sentenced for the breaking and entering charges. Hanemaayer pleaded guilty to avoid a much longer sentence ranging from six to 10 years, and was sentenced to two years less a day in a provincial reformatory. He was released in June 1990 after serving 16 months in prison, including eight months in pre-trial detention.

At the time of the attack in 1987, the Scarborough area was being plagued by the so-called 'Scarborough Rapist', who was later identified as serial killer and rapist Paul Bernardo. Bernardo was convicted of numerous sexual assaults in Scarborough, sexual assaults elsewhere, and the murders of three girls he committed with his wife Karla Homolka.

In 2006, Bernardo confessed to the 1987 assault and provided a detailed account to investigating officers, who also interviewed Hanemaayer several weeks later but did not inform him of Bernardo's confession. Hanemaayer became aware of Bernardo's confession in late 2007, after which he appealed to the Ontario Court of Appeal in June 2008. As a result, the court cleared Hanemaayer of the convictions and Justice Rosenberg stated that "it is profoundly regrettable that errors in the justice system led to this miscarriage of justice and the devastating effect it has had on Mr. Hanemaayer and his family."

In June 2010, Hanemaayer commenced a $1.1 million lawsuit for damages suffered as a result of his 1989 conviction for the assault. The lawsuit was unsuccessful due to the courts deciding not to compensate him.

== Ivan Henry ==
Ivan Henry was convicted of multiple sexual assaults in Vancouver, Canada from 1980 to 1982. Similar assaults continued while he was jailed, leading to further investigation by police. His conviction was overturned in 2010. In December 2021, Henry was awarded $8 million in compensation for the 27 years he spent in prison.

On January 29, 2025 Henry was found liable to 5 of the complainants on a civil balance of probabilities and ordered to pay compensation of $375,000 to each of them. Justice Gropper's decision read, in part:

My finding that Mr. Henry is liable to each plaintiff for damages for sexual assault means that it is more likely than not that he was their attacker and performed the sexual assaults upon them that they have each described, on a balance of probabilities. It does not mean that he committed the sexual offences that he was found to have committed in 1983 beyond a reasonable doubt.

As I pointed out, I do not disagree with the findings of the Court of Appeal in 2010, nor am I finding them to be in error. I do not find that Mr. Henry’s sentence was “cut short”. He should not have been convicted and should not have spent any time in jail.

Similarly, I do not find that Mr. Henry “wrongfully gained” the damages that he was awarded by Hinkson C.J. He was entitled to the damages that he received.

== Réjean Hinse ==
Réjean Hinse was convicted for aggravated robbery and sentenced to 15 years in prison for his alleged part in the armed robbery in December 1961 of a general store in Mont-Laurier, Québec. He campaigned to establish his innocence based on the fact that he had been in Montreal, over two hundred kilometres away, at the time the crime was committed. In 1997 he was acquitted by the Supreme Court of Canada, which ruled that evidence presented at his trial was insufficient to convict him of aggravated robbery. Hinse was awarded $13.1 million compensation, payable by the Quebec and Canadian Federal governments, the largest wrongful conviction award in Canadian history.

== Donald Marshall, Jr. ==
Donald Marshall, Jr., at the time 17, was convicted of murdering acquaintance Sandy Seale in 1971 and sentenced to life in prison. The two had confronted Roy Ebsary, an older man they encountered in Wentworth Park in Sydney, Nova Scotia, during the late evening with the intent to "roll a drunk". A short scuffle occurred and Seale fell mortally wounded by a knife blow. Ebsary admitted that he had stabbed Seale but then lied about his role to the police who immediately focused on Marshall, who was 'known to them' from previous incidents.

Marshall spent 11 years in jail before being acquitted by the Nova Scotia Court of Appeal in 1983. A witness came forward to say he had seen another man stab Seale, and several prior witness statements pinpointing Marshall were recanted. Ebsary was subsequently tried and convicted of manslaughter.

== Martensville satanic sex scandal ==
The Martensville satanic sex scandal occurred in Martensville, Saskatchewan, in 1992 where a mother alleged that a local woman who ran a babysitting service and day care centre in her home had sexually abused her child. Police began an investigation and allegations began to snowball. More than a dozen persons, including five police officers from two different forces, ultimately faced over 100 charges connected with running a Satanic cult called The Brotherhood of The Ram, which allegedly practised ritualized sexual abuse of numerous children at a "Devil Church".

The son of the day care owner was tried and found guilty, but a new investigation concluded that the original trial was motivated by 'emotional hysteria.' In 2003, defendants sued for wrongful prosecution. In 2004, Ron and Linda Sterling received $924,000 in reparations.

== David Milgaard ==
David Milgaard was convicted of raping and murdering 20-year-old nursing assistant Gail Miller in 1969. When she was found on a snowbank, Milgaard and his friends, Ron Wilson and Nichol John, were picking up their friend, Albert Cadrain. Tipped off by Cadrain, who admitted he was mostly interested in the $2,000 reward for information, British Columbia police arrested Milgaard in May 1969 and sent him back to Saskatchewan where he was charged with Miller's murder. Cadrain testified that he had seen Milgaard return the night of Miller's murder in blood-stained clothing.

Both Wilson and John were also called to testify against him. They had told police that they had been with Milgaard the entire day and that they believed him to be innocent, but they changed their stories for the court. Wilson later recanted his testimony claiming that he had been told he was personally under suspicion and wanted to alleviate the pressure on himself. Milgaard was sentenced to life in prison in January 1970.

Milgaard appealed his conviction several times, but was blocked both by bureaucracy and by a justice system unreceptive to those who were not willing to admit their guilt. But in July 1997, a DNA laboratory in the United Kingdom released a report confirming that semen samples on the victim's clothing did not originate with Milgaard—for all intents and purposes clearing Milgaard of the crime. The Saskatchewan government then apologized for the wrongful conviction, and Larry Fisher was arrested days later. Fisher had been living in Cadrain's basement at the time of the murder.

== Guy Paul Morin ==
Guy Paul Morin was a suspect in the October 1984 rape and murder of his 9-year-old next-door neighbour, Christine Jessop. Morin was found not guilty of murder at his first trial in 1986, but convicted and sentenced to life imprisonment at his second trial after the Crown appealed. Improvements in DNA testing led to a test in 1995 which excluded Morin as the murderer, after which Morin's appeal of his conviction was allowed (i.e., the conviction was reversed), and a directed verdict of acquittal entered in the appeal. Morin is 100% exonerated with the discovery, in 2020, of Jessop's murderer.

== Willie Nepoose ==
Willie Nepoose was convicted in 1987 for the 1986 murder of Rose Marie Desjarlais. In 1992 the conviction was overturned when it was discovered one of the witnesses had perjured herself, the police had not disclosed some evidence, and evidence was discovered that he was with his brothers in a hotel at the time of the murder.

== Roméo Phillion ==
Roméo Phillion was convicted of the 1967 murder of Ottawa firefighter Léopold Roy, after making a confession to police which he recanted two hours later. He spent 31 years in prison and five years on parole. The case was reopened in 2006, and in March 2009, the Ontario Court of Appeal overturned his 1972 murder conviction and granted him a new trial, in part because a 1968 police report establishing a clear alibi for Phillion had not been turned over to his defence lawyer in his original trial.

== Thomas Sophonow ==
Thomas Sophonow was tried three times in the 1981 murder of doughnut-shop clerk Barbara Stoppel. Sophonow spent four years imprisoned but was acquitted by the Manitoba Court of Appeal in 1985.

== William Mullins-Johnson ==
William Mullins-Johnson, of Sault Ste. Marie, Ontario was found guilty of the first-degree murder of his niece, Valin Johnson, after a two-and-a-half-week trial in September 1994. He was convicted after a jury trial in which now-disgraced forensic pathologist Charles Smith's evidence played a major role in determining the time of death, the cause of death, and whether the girl had been sexually assaulted. Mullins-Johnson had babysat Valin, 4, and her 3-year-old brother on the evening of June 26, 1993. When the girl's mother returned home, she did not check on her daughter. At 7 a.m. the next day she found Valin dead in bed.

A local pathologist performed an autopsy on Valin. Then "consultation reports" were sought from Smith and four other specialists, based on tissue samples and other evidence from the autopsy. Smith was the only consultant to conclude Valin was sexually assaulted at the time of death. That contradicted the defence's point that Valin, who had a history of vomiting in bed, might have died of natural causes. The jury convicted, which the Ontario Court of Appeal upheld in 1996. The Supreme Court of Canada dismissed a further appeal in 1998.

Attempts were made to clear his name based on available DNA technology, but the tissue could not be located by Smith, who was given the evidence by the pathologist who did the autopsy, until 2005, 11 years after the trial, when the missing tissue samples turned up in Smith's office. William Mullins-Johnson was released on bail in 2005, pending review of his case. On July 16, 2007, a report by three expert pathologists (written unbeknownst to the lawyers working on his behalf) determined there was no evidence that the girl was sexually assaulted, and the Ontario Attorney General Michael Bryant said that William Mullins-Johnson's conviction “cannot stand” and that he should be acquitted by the appeals court. On October 15, 2007, he was acquitted by the Ontario Court of Appeal.

In 2010, five years after filing a $13 million lawsuit for wrongful conviction, Mullins-Johnson and the Government of Ontario reached a $4.25 million out-of-court settlement.

== Robert Mailman and Walter Gillespie ==
Robert Mailman and Walter Gillespie were two men from Saint John, New Brunswick who were wrongfully found guilty of second-degree murder in 1984 for the 1983 murder of George Gilman Leeman. The only evidence used in the trials had been two witness testimonies which had later been recanted due to admission of giving false testimonies. They were both sentenced to life imprisonment. Mailman and Gillespie, both of whom had been later put on parole, were fully acquitted for the murder on January 4, 2024.

Both Mailman and Gillespie's freedom as innocent men have been short-lived; Gillespie died in his apartment on April 19, 2024, just over three months after being exonerated. He was 80. Mailman died of liver cancer on October 9, 2025, at the age of 77.

== Brandon Klayme ==
Brandon Klayme was arrested in February 2020 for allegedly grooming a 12-year-old girl over Kik, after Halifax Regional Police confused his Kik account with the one used by the perpetrator, which had a nearly identical name. In 2023 he was convicted of child pornography charges, child luring, and making sexually explicit content available to a minor and sentenced to 18 months in prison. Klayme's account name was the only evidence linking him to the victim. In 2026 his legal team discovered the mistake and petitioned the Nova Scotia Court of Appeal, which declared that Klayme "should never have been charged, let alone convicted" and acquitted him on all charges. The true perpetrator is believed to have been an American based in California.
