= Centre of Forensic Sciences (Ontario) =

Canadian crime laboratory

Agency overview
- Formed: 1966
- Preceding agency: Attorney-General’s Laboratory
- Jurisdiction: Ontario
- Headquarters: 25 Morton Shulman Avenue Toronto, Ontario, Canada
- Agency executive: Dr. Amy Peaire, PhD, Director
- Website: Official website

The Centre of Forensic Sciences (French: Centre des sciences judiciaires de l'Ontario, CFS) is a laboratory providing forensic science services to law enforcement agencies in Ontario, Canada. It is part of the government of Ontario Ministry of Solicitor General public safety division.

== History ==
=== Founding of the Centre of Forensic Sciences ===
The roots of the centre are in the creation of the Attorney General's Laboratory in 1951. The first home was at an old mansion at 11 Queen's Park Crescent and then moved to the old Victoria Hospital for Sick Children at College and Elizabeth Streets. It was renamed the Centre of Forensic Sciences in 1966, transferred to the new Ministry of the Solicitor General in 1972 and again to the Ministry of Community Safety and Correctional Services in 2002. The Northern Regional Laboratory was opened in Sault Ste. Marie in 1992 to serve Northern Ontario.

The Northern Regional Laboratory was mandated by the Ontario Government in 1986 and became operational in 1992 at Roberta Bondar Place in Sault Ste. Marie. The NRL was started with a staff of 13 personnel under Lab Manager Dr. John Wells, PhD. The NRL serves areas north and west of Sudbury.

=== Modern era ===
The inquiries, and the Askov decision (dismissed charges from unreasonable delay in awaiting crown preparation for trial), in the 1990s led CFS to receive increased staffing and reorganize to improve the speed and quality of forensic services.

== Inquires and other governmental recommendations ==
=== The Kaufman Commission of Inquiry ===
The Kaufman Inquiry was ordered by the Ontario Government to investigate and make recommendations regarding the wrongful conviction of Guy Paul Morin in the murder of Christine Jessop in 1984. A substantial portion of the arrest warrant and prosecution case against Mr. Morin relied on hair and fibre evidence supplied by CFS. Additionally it came to light that CFS had inadequate tracking of evidence being processed through the lab. Problems were also exposed regarding inappropriate police communications between police and forensic scientists. Mr. Morin was exonerated by DNA evidence in 1995. The Kaufman Inquiry resulted in 119 recommendations of which a number applied to the role of CFS.

=== The Campbell Inquiry ===
The Campbell Inquiry in 1999 looked into the police and justice system failings around the Paul Bernardo case. As a sexual assault suspect, Bernardo was sampled for DNA comparison to case evidence by Metro Toronto Police in November 1990 but the sample was not analyzed by CFS until December 1992. During this time Bernardo had moved to another region and committed four additional sexual assaults and two sadistic sexual murders.

=== 2007 Annual Report of the Office of the Auditor General of Ontario ===
Chapter 3 of the 2007 annual Auditor General's report dealt with the Centre of Forensic Sciences. Specifically, it made observations and recommendations about CFS turn-around time performance and efficiency. The report made 5 recommendations regarding; improving case turn-around times, consulting clients about turn-around targets, tracking effects of urgent cases, analysis of causes for longer than target turn-around times, and tracking efficiency in dollars and inter-laboratory comparisons.

=== The Inquiry into Pediatric Forensic Pathology in Ontario (Goudge Inquiry) ===
The Goudge Inquiry was initiated to look at the work of Dr. Charles Smith, who erred in numerous pediatric forensic pathology cases through the 1990s. The inquiry also examined the system for forensic pathology in Ontario as a whole. Although this inquiry did not directly concern CFS there were several recommendations applicable to CFS. The director of CFS, Dr. Ray Prime testified at the inquiry regarding CFS quality system and positive changes to the forensic lab stemming from the Kaufman Inquiry. The Inquiry recommended CFS to collaborate with the Office of the Chief Coroner to improve turn-around times for toxicology reports, which are usually prevalent in forensic pathology. Also, CFS is to collaborate with the Office of the Chief Coroner to better prioritize urgent forensic samples. The report also asked the director of CFS (or delegate) to sit on a governing council to guide improvements in the work of the Office of the Chief Coroner and forensic pathology.

== Locations and jurisdictions ==
The main location for the CFS is 25 Morton Shulman Avenue in Toronto. The state-of-the-art laboratory was completed in 2012, and currently houses the Office of the Chief Coroner, the Ontario Forensic Pathology Service and the Center of Forensic Sciences. The building, designed by Stantec and built under a public-private partnership by Carillion, provides 663,000 square feet of accommodation and has the capacity for more than 2,500 autopsies and over 15,000 forensic science cases per year.

== See also ==
- PolyAnalytik
