= Roméo Phillion =

Roméo Phillion (April 29, 1939 – November 2, 2015) was convicted of the 1967 murder of Ottawa firefighter Léopold Roy, after making a confession to police which he recanted two hours later.

== Biography ==
Phillion spent 31 years in prison and five years on parole. The case was reopened in 2006, and in March 2009, the Ontario Court of Appeal overturned his 1972 murder conviction and granted him a new trial, in part because a 1968 police report establishing a clear alibi for Phillion had not been turned over to his defence lawyer in his original trial. He was assisted by the Innocence Project and by lawyer James Lockyer, a director of the Association in Defence of the Wrongly Convicted. On 29 April 2010, crown prosecutors withdrew the murder charge against him.

In August 2006, Minister of Justice Vic Toews referred two questions about the case to the Ontario Court of Appeal:

- Would the new information concerning the non-disclosure of certain material be admissible on appeal to the Court of Appeal?
- Are the recent expert reports on the reliability of Mr. Phillion's confession admissible on appeal to the Court of Appeal?

Phillion's thirty-one-year sentence was the longest ever served by a Canadian prisoner whose conviction was later overturned.

In 2012, Roméo Phillion launched a $14 million lawsuit against the Ontario government.

Phillion died on November 2, 2015, at the age of 76 in Mississauga, Ontario, after a long illness. He died before his lawsuit against the Ontario government was settled.

== See also ==
- Overturned convictions in Canada
- List of miscarriage of justice cases
- Rubin Carter
