= Saskatoon foster parent scandal =

Child abuse scandal in Saskatoon, Canada

The Saskatoon foster parent scandal occurred in Saskatoon, Saskatchewan, Canada. There were two similar events around the same time where an allegation of child sex abuse escalated into claims of satanic ritual abuse. The more widely known of the two is the Martensville satanic sex scandal, and the second but earlier story is of the foster parent scandal in nearby Saskatoon.

== Media coverage ==
A similar story arose in Martensville of sexual abuse also involving claims of a satanic nature, and occurred not long after the Foster Parent Scandal. As the media picked up the reporting on the claims of Satanic sex abuse, the reporting on the similar Foster Parent Scandal decreased and was overshadowed. In 2000, the CBC's The Fifth Estate reported on the events surrounding the case of reported foster parent abuse in a story titled "The Scandal of the Century". Local reporter Dan Zakreski, then with the Saskatoon StarPhoenix, also reported on the story. Further reporting on the case was published in The Globe and Mail.

== History ==
At the centre of the case were three children, Michael Ross (also known as Tom Black) and his younger twin sisters Kathy and Michelle Ross (also known as Julie and Mary Black). The three children entered the care of social services in 1987 after their parents, Helen and Don Ross (also known as "Emma and Don Black"), were found to not be capable of adequately caring for their children. Michael's kindergarten teachers had reported that in 1986 (when Michael was seven years old) that he was behaving in sexually aggressive ways, including inappropriately touching other children, and undressing and inviting both other children and staff to have sex with him. When the children entered the foster home of Dale and Anita Klassen (also known as "Scott" and "Emma Hepner") on February 13, 1987, the Klassens were not informed of the children's troubled history, nor provide any special assistance regarding the reported concerns. Shortly after the children arrived, Emma noticed that the children were engaging in sexually overt behaviour that included kissing, hugging, and being naked together in their playroom. Moreover, in April of that year, a babysitter reported to Emma that they had witnessed Michael inserting a butter knife and liquid soap into Michelle's vagina. The children were interviewed after this was reported to the police and the Sexual Assault Centre, but the only conclusion was that the children knew far more about sexual matters than they should for their age, but they were unable to determine if the children had ever been sexually assaulted. The report also noted that Michael, then eight years old, would sneak downstairs in the middle of the night to dress in lady's high heel shoes and pantyhose.

When Helen Ross agreed to her children becoming permanent wards in November 1989, the Klassens agreed to care for Kathleen and Michelle, but were concerned by Michael's sexual and aggressive behaviours. Michael was transferred to a special foster home in nearby Warman run by Marilyn and Lyle Thompson, and shortly after his arrival, he alleged that his sisters had been abused in the Klassen home. As a result, Social Services investigated and removed the girls from the Klassen home and placed them in the same foster home as Michael. Foster mother Marilyn Thompson observed similar behaviours in the children that the Klassens had, and a medical exam found some evidence that was consistent with sexual abuse. There were also reports that the family dog had been subjected to sexual acts. The children began seeing a child therapist in private practice, Carol Bunko-Ruys. It was during the sessions with Bunko-Ruys that the children began making allegations that their parents, Helen and Don Ross, their mother's new partner, Don White (who later completed a lie detector test that demonstrated evidence suggesting he was innocent), the Klassens and several of the Klassen's relatives, including in-laws the Kvellos (also known as "Marcuses"), Dale's parents, Peter and Marie (also known as "Sophie"), and Dale's brother Richard had been abusing them. The allegations included that the adults had cut the children with knives, had forced the children to participate in orgies, have sex with dogs and flying bat-like creatures, consume blood, urine, and feces, eat the eyeballs and flesh of roasted babies, and other satanic rituals. Saskatoon Police Cpl. Brian Dueck was called in to begin interviewing the children as the allegations escalated. During the interviews, the children recounted the acts of sexual abuse that had been committed by Michael, but Cpl. Dueck deferred to the opinion and insistence of Bunko-Ruys in keeping the children together in the belief that it would make the children easier to treat. With the children together again, Michael's abuse of his sisters would resume for the next three years, and the stories of abuse the children told escalated.

Eventually, 16 adults were arrested and charged with over 70 counts of sexual assault, incest, and gross indecency, and went to trial in 1993. The charges against 12 of the 16 were stayed due to lack of evidence. Peter Klassen pled guilty in a plea deal to protect other members of his family, lost on a subsequent appeal, and served his sentence without parole. Don White was convicted, but his conviction was later overturned in 1996 by the Supreme Court of Canada. Retrials were ordered for Helen and Don Ross, but the Crown did not pursue these retrials. Years later, the children reported a different account than they had previously, and admitted to lying when they were interviewed as children. One of the sisters, age 16 at the time, reported that "My brother was abusing me and my sister and we'd get manipulated to say it was the adults and not him." Michael later signed an affidavit stating, "I made up these stories because I felt pressured and was making up stories as we went along. Once I had made up some stories, I felt pressured not to deny them, and to make up more stories." The Klassen and Kvello families were eventually paid $2.46 million by the Government of Saskatchewan in a 2004 damages agreement following a 2003 court case. Kathy and Michelle Ross received $560,000 from the Government of Saskatchewan in a lawsuit settlement related to the abuse they suffered while in foster care.

== Martensville satanic sex scandal ==
In nearby Martensville in 1992, a similar case occurred that also involved children in care, allegations of sexual abuse, and allegations of satanic cults and rituals. The events of the case occurred after the Foster Parent Scandal events, but were overshadowed by the media coverage of the Martensville case. That case was centred around the Sterling family and the children in their day care.

== See also ==
- Overturned convictions in Canada
