= Hinse =

Hinse is a surname. Notable people with the surname include:

- André Hinse (born 1945), Canadian ice hockey player
- Gordon Hinse (born 1987), Canadian football player
- Réjean Hinse (born c. 1938), Canadian who was wrongfully convicted of armed robbery
