= Kaufman Report =

Inquiry in Ontario, Canada to address a wrongful conviction

The Commission on Proceedings Involving Guy Paul Morin, also known as the Kaufman Commission or Morin Inquiry, was a 1996 royal commission appointed by the Government of Ontario to address the wrongful conviction in 1992 of Guy Paul Morin for the murder of Christine Jessop on 3 October 1984, for which he was exonerated by DNA evidence on 23 January 1995.

The public inquiry was issued on 26 June 1996 by the Lieutenant Governor-in-Council, appointing Fred Kaufman, Q.C., a former judge of the Quebec Court of Appeal, as commissioner. The hearings began on 10 February 1997 and continued for 146 days. The Kaufman report was released on 9 April 1998 and contained 119 recommendations.

Morin's conviction has been cited as one of Canada's most famous wrongful conviction cases. The inquiry led to significant alterations of how police investigated murders in Canada. Lawyer Bruce MacFarlane said that the report "is arguably the most comprehensive judicial review that has ever been undertaken into the causes of wrongful conviction, and how to avoid them."

The real killer remained unidentified until 2020. On 15 October 2020, Toronto Police identified Jessop’s murderer as Calvin Hoover, a friend and neighbour of the Jessop family who was 28 in 1984. Hoover took his own life in 2015.

== History ==
=== Death of Christine Jessop ===
Christine Jessop
- Born: Christine Marion Jessop; 29 November 1974; Queensville, Ontario, Canada
- Died: c. 3 October 1984 (aged 9); Ontario, Canada
- Cause of death: Stabbing
- Body discovered: 31 December 1984
- Known for: Her abduction, sexual assault, and murder, unsolved for 35 years until 2020

Christine Marion Jessop (29 November 1974 – c. 3 October 1984) was a 9-year-old Canadian girl from Queensville, Ontario, who was abducted, sexually assaulted, and murdered in October 1984. Her body was found about 50 kilometres (31 mi) from her home on New Year's Eve of the same year.

On October 3, 1984, Jessop's mother Janet and elder brother, Kenney, had travelled to Toronto's East Detention Centre where her father Bob was in custody. Bob Jessop had been incarcerated two weeks earlier for misappropriation of funds. Janet felt that, at 9 years old, Christine was too young to visit the detention centre. Despite her protests, Christine had been left behind in Queensville to attend school as usual. Christine returned home from school that afternoon on the school bus. She dropped her backpack off at home, but was not there when her mother and brother returned home, shortly after 4 p.m. Jessop went from her home to the variety store close to her home. The shopkeeper said that Christine came to the store alone between 3:30 and 4:00 p.m., bought bubble gum and left a minute or so later. Christine was supposed to meet a friend from school at a nearby park, but failed to show up.

Jessop was declared missing later that evening. Two months later, on 31 December, her remains were found in a farmer's field in Sunderland Brock Township, 55 km (34 mi) east from her home; she had been stabbed to death and investigators discovered semen stains on her underwear.

=== Conviction and appeal ===
Police turned their attention to Jessop's next-door neighbour, Guy Paul Morin, on 14 February 1985, after he was one of a few people mentioned by Jessop's mother.

Police set up surveillance of the Morin home on 19 February, with two officers eventually interviewing him three days later, on 22 February. On 22 April 1985, Morin was arrested. He was twice put on trial for first-degree murder; the first trial began on 7 January 1986, for which he was acquitted. However, on 4 March, the Attorney General of Ontario launched an appeal of Morin's acquittal. The Crown claimed that the trial judge had made a mistake in directing the jury about the meaning of "reasonable doubt" and that the acquittal should thus be thrown out and Morin retried. The Court of Appeal agreed, and on 5 June 1987, it ordered a new trial. Morin appealed this decision to the Supreme Court of Canada, who dismissed the appeal on 17 November 1988.

This second trial began on 28 May 1990, and Morin was convicted of first-degree murder on 30 July 1992.

Immediately after Morin's conviction, a grassroots organization called Justice for Guy Paul Morin Committee was established to aid him in his search for exoneration. The Committee's first objective was to help Morin to appeal his conviction and in the meantime, to apply for his release on bail while he waited for the appeal to be decided. Morin was granted bail on 9 February 1993. Following this decision, the Committee reorganized itself as the Association in Defence of the Wrongly Convicted (AIDWYC), now Innocence Canada, having decided to broaden its mandate from defending Morin to working on behalf of all wrongly convicted Canadians.

It was not until 23 January 1995, almost 10 years after he was first arrested, that Morin was exonerated as a result of DNA testing that had not previously been available. In February 1995, the Ontario Attorney General's office transferred the case from the Durham Regional Police to the Toronto Police. However, after interviewing over 300 suspects, a special, 9-man task force disbanded in March.

The real killer remained unidentified until 2020, when his DNA was linked to the crime scene using genetic genealogy.

== The Commission and Report ==
On 26 June 1996, the Lieutenant Governor-in-Council issued the "Commission on Proceedings Involving Guy Paul Morin" to inquire into the issue, appointing Fred Kaufman, Q.C., a former judge of the Quebec Court of Appeal, as commissioner. The Commission was officially mandated to "inquire into the conduct of the investigation into the death of Christine Jessop, the conduct of the Centre for Forensic Sciences in relation to the maintenance, security and preservation of forensic evidence, and into the criminal proceedings involving the charge that Guy Paul Morin murdered Christine Jessop."

The hearings began on 10 February 1997 and continued for 146 days, calling 120 witnesses and combing through over 100,000 pages of documents. Twenty-five parties were given standing and numerous witnesses were called to testify who were either experts or participants in the administration of criminal justice from around the world.

Kaufman gave an oral ruling on 22 October 1997. His subsequent report was released in 2 volumes on 9 April 1998, containing 1,380 pages and made 119 recommendations.

=== Recommendations ===
Kaufman said that he believed no Crown Counsel or police officer "ever intended to convict an innocent person." Rather, he said, they developed a "staggering" tunnel vision regarding their belief in Morin's guilt that led to a lack of objectivity and serious errors in judgment. The report defines tunnel vision as a "single-minded and overly narrow focus on a particular investigative or prosecutorial theory, so as to unreasonably colour the evaluation of information received." In the conclusion to his Report, Kaufman commented that, "An innocent person was convicted of a heinous crime he did not commit. Science helped convict him. Science exonerated him."

As such, many of Kaufman's 119 recommendations were systemic in nature, dealing with ways in which police and prosecutors can avoid a narrow mind set—ranging from better interviewing techniques and improved methods of gathering and storing evidence from a crime scene, to continuing education of officers.

Issues		Recommendation(s)
Forensic Evidence		Limitations on forensic evidence has to be appreciated by all the parties in a court proceeding and explained to the jury; Forensic material should be retained to allow for replicate testing; Scientists should be working to challenge or disprove a hypothesis rather than to prove one; Defence should have access to forensic experts; Scientists should be trained in testifying so their evidence isn't misinterpreted
In-Custody (Jailhouse) informants	Prosecution procedure for using in-custody informers	Crown policy should reflect dangers of such evidence; Reliability of evidence is key (lists 13 criteria on assessing reliability)
In-Custody (Jailhouse) informants	Jury warning	Warning stronger than a Vetrovec should be given
Police	Training officers	Training of officers: Setting of minimum standards respecting initial and ongoing training
Police	Taping suspect interviews	All interviews conducted with suspects should be video/audio-taped; If not videotaped, trial judge can draw negative inference
Police	Taping witness interviews	Police should be encouraged to videotape interviews with witnesses whose testimony may be challenged in court; Training for police interview techniques to enhance reliability
Police	Alibi witnesses	Officers other than officers involved in investigation of accused should investigate the alibi of the accused
Police	Avoidance of tunnel vision	Education of police officers on how to identify and avoid tunnel vision; Status of investigating officers should not be elevated for pursuing "best" lead/suspect
Police	Use of polygraphs	Police should be instructed as to the proper use and limitations of polygraphs
Police	Use of Criminal Profiling	Police should use criminal profiling as an investigative tool only
Police	Police notebooks	Must be a comprehensive and consistent retention policy for police notebooks: Notebooks should be easily located; Ultimate goal should be towards computerization
Police	Missing person investigations	Police should be mindful that it may escalate into major crime investigation and must take appropriate measures to preserve evidence; Lists proper procedure to employ in a body site search
Crown	Training	Crown should be educated on identification and avoidance of tunnel vision; Evidence of other suspects should be revisited
Crown	Strength of evidence	Crown has a duty not to raise evidence that is reasonably considered to be untrue
Crown	Interviewing Techniques	Lists criteria for increasing reliability of interviews including taping of interviews
Crown	Crown advocacy	Crowns should be trained on limits of Crown advocacy including being prevented from appealing jury acquittal
Crown	Crown disclosure	Creation of committee to review and discuss disclosure issues
Lack of independent review of wrongful convictions		Independent board to review wrongful convictions
Relationship between Crown and Defence		Provincial government should provide funding for criminal bar to discuss relevant issues
Lack of disclosure of Alibi defence		Legislative amendments should be made to permit an accused's exculpatory statement made upon arrest in certain conditions
Treatment of the Accused		Person charged with crime should be treated neutrally in court
Jury charge		Jury should be cautioned that evidence may be coloured by the criminal charges or other external factors such as the notoriety of the case
Limited powers of the Court of Appeal		Court of Appeal should be allowed to entertain "lurking doubt" when deciding whether to set aside a conviction; "Fresh evidence" powers of the Court of Appeal should be expanded / changed

== Real murderer ==
Calvin Hoover
- Born: Calvin Dana Hoover; 1956
- Died: 2015 (aged 58–59)
- Cause of death: Suicide
- Known for: Murder of Christine Jessop

Jessop's real murderer remained unidentified until 15 October 2020, when Toronto Police named the killer as Calvin Hoover, who was 28 at the time of the case.

Hoover's DNA was linked to the crime scene using genetic genealogy. In 2015, he took his own life in Port Hope, Ontario. Following an autopsy, a sample of his blood was on file at the Centre of Forensic Sciences laboratory in Toronto, which is what detectives used to conclusively match his DNA to the Jessop crime scene.

Hoover was apparently a friend of the Jessop family; in fact, the 9-year-old girl visited Hoover and his family at their home in the days prior to her going missing. Calvin Hoover, his wife Heather and Bob Jessop all worked together at Eastern Independent Telecom. Calvin Hoover was a cable installer, Heather was a dispatcher, and Bob was the "lead hand" of cable installers. Heather Hoover was very close with Janet Jessop. Ken Jessop remembers going to the Hoover family home and the Hoover family coming to the Jessop home for barbecues, birthdays and other events. He also recalled that the work connection had resulted in Hoover knowing that he and his mother were going to visit his father that day, and that Christine would be home alone; Mrs. Jessop had called the Hoovers in the morning before leaving to visit her husband, to see if either of them had any work-related questions for Bob Jessop. Calvin Hoover, after killing Christine, joined the organized search for her. Heather later discussed how Calvin supported her when she regularly visited Christine's grave site, consoling her through the years; their marriage ended in 1993.

Hoover's wife was interviewed by York Regional Police the day following Jessop's disappearance. While Calvin Hoover's name was mentioned more than once in the homicide case file – including that his wife told investigators that he was taking care of their kids and had nothing to add to her statement – he was never actually questioned. Police have since confirmed that Hoover was never questioned, but the oversight has never been explained.
