= James Lockyer (activist) =

Canadian lawyer and activist (born 1949)

James Lockyer CM (born December 21, 1949) is a lawyer and a prominent social justice activist in Toronto, Canada. He is a founding director of the Association in Defence of the Wrongly Convicted (AIDWYC). He has been involved in exposing more than ten wrongful convictions in Canada, including the cases of Guy Paul Morin, David Milgaard, Clayton Johnson and Gregory Parsons. Several of these cases have become the subject of public inquiries.

Born in Orpington, England, he studied law at the University of Nottingham, graduating with a Bachelor of Laws in 1971. In 1972 he accepted a scholarship to McGill University in Montreal where he began teaching. Mr. Lockyer also taught law at the University of Windsor until 1977, when he went into private practice as a criminal lawyer. Lockyer is a former law partner with Edward H. Royle.

Mr. Lockyer has worked on behalf of Steven Truscott, whose 1959 conviction of the murder of Lynne Harper came under review by the Court of Appeal for Ontario, and of Robert Baltovich, whose murder conviction was quashed by the Ontario Court of Appeal in November, 2004. On August 28, 2007, the Ontario Court of Appeal acquitted Steven Truscott, concluding, "based on evidence that qualifies as fresh evidence in these proceedings, we are satisfied that Mr. Truscott's conviction was a miscarriage of justice and must be quashed". On April 22, 2008, Robert Baltovich was also acquitted in his retrial, after the Crown declined to present any evidence against him. Lockyer has twice been a candidate for the New Democratic Party. He ran federally in the Toronto riding of St. Paul's, first in the 1979 federal election and then in the 1980 federal election. He placed third on both attempts.

He is an "OSE" (Old St. Edwardian), or alumnus, of St. Edward's School, Oxford, an English Public school. Lockyer was a keen rugby player, and was a founding member of the McGill Graduates RFC after law school.

== Awards ==
- Doctor of Laws, University of Victoria, 2009
- G. Arthur Martin medal for outstanding contribution to criminal justice, 2004
- Doctor of Laws, University of Windsor, 2015
