= Fred Kaufman =

Canadian jurist (1924–2023)

Fred Kaufman CM FRSC KC
- Born: Fred Kaufman; May 7, 1924; Vienna, Austria
- Died: December 27, 2023 (aged 99); Toronto, Ontario, Canada
- Education: Bishop's University (B.Sc.) McGill University (LL.B.)
- Occupations: Lawyer, Justice, Arbitrator
- Known for: Quebec Court of Appeal Justice (1973–1991) Morin and Truscott inquiries
- Notable work: Searching for Justice: An Autobiography
- Awards: Queen Elizabeth II Golden Jubilee Medal (2002), Queen Elizabeth II Diamond Jubilee Medal (2012), Honorary Doctor of Laws, University of New Brunswick (2012)
- Honors: CM (1992), FRSC (2002), KC (1971)

Fred Kaufman CM FRSC KC (May 7, 1924 – December 27, 2023) was a Canadian justice, lawyer, and arbitrator.

== Life and career ==
Fred Kaufman was born on May 7, 1924 in Vienna. He graduated with a Bachelor of Science degree from Bishop's University and then spent six years as a reporter for the Montreal Star. He graduated from the McGill University Faculty of Law in 1954, where he was the second ever editor-in-chief of the McGill Law Journal.

Following law school, Kaufman founded the law firm Kaufman, Yarosky & Fish. He was appointed to the Québec Court of Appeal in 1973, and became acting Chief Justice of Quebec from 1990 to 1991 when he retired. In 2005 he published the memoir Searching for Justice: An Autobiography.

After retirement as a judge, he was appointed by the Ontario government to preside over an inquiry into the wrongful murder conviction of Guy Paul Morin in 1997-98. Later in 2002-04, he presided for the Government of Canada over an inquiry into the murder trial of Steven Truscott, which led to Truscott's conviction being overturned by the Ontario Court of Appeal.

Kaufman died on December 27, 2023, at the age of 99 in Toronto.

== Honours ==
- Queen's Counsel (1971)
- Member of the Order of Canada (1992)
- Queen Elizabeth II Golden Jubilee Medal (2002)
- Fellow of the Royal Society of Canada (2002)
- Queen Elizabeth II Diamond Jubilee Medal (2012)
- Doctor of Laws, University of New Brunswick (2012)
