= Ivan Henry =

Ivan William Mervin Henry is a Canadian man who was convicted on ten counts of sexual assault. He was sentenced to an indeterminate period in prison and ultimately spent 27 years in jail before his conviction was quashed.

== Arrest and conviction ==
Henry was arrested for a series of sexual assaults that took place in downtown Vancouver between 1980 and 1982. On March 15, 1983, Henry was convicted on ten counts of sexual assault on the basis of weak identification evidence. He was given an indeterminate prison sentence and declared a dangerous offender.

== Acquittal ==
Attacks similar to Henry's alleged crimes continued after he was incarcerated. In 2002, the Vancouver police re-opened 25 unsolved sexual assaults that took place between 1983 and 1988 in the same areas of Vancouver and the assaults for which Henry was convicted. Another man, who had been a suspect in police investigation of Henry, was linked to three of these later offences through DNA evidence, and later pleaded guilty to these crimes. On the basis of the similarities between the assaults, Vancouver prosecutors alerted the Attorney General and a special prosecutor was appointed to investigate Henry's conviction and the potential miscarriage of justice. In 2008, the special prosecutor recommended that the Crown not oppose efforts by Henry to reopen his appeal.

In 2010, the British Columbia Court of Appeal quashed Henry's conviction and entered acquittals on all charges. Justice Low held that "the verdict on each count was not one that a properly instructed jury acting judicially could reasonably have rendered." It is believed that no one in Canadian history has spent more time in jail before being subsequently acquitted.

Henry has brought a civil suit against the BC government, Vancouver police, and others for compensation. The issue of whether Henry is entitled to civil compensation for the breach of his Charter rights has worked its way through appeals to the Supreme Court of Canada. On June 9, 2014, Chief Justice Beverley McLachlin stated the constitutional question in this case as follows: "Does s. 24(1) of the Canadian Charter of Rights and Freedoms authorize a court of competent jurisdiction to award damages against the Crown for prosecutorial misconduct absent proof of malice?"

On May 1, 2015, the Supreme Court of Canada ruled on that question in Henry's favour.

On June 8, 2016, Henry was awarded 8 million dollars for his wrongful imprisonment.

== Civil case ==
5 of the women who had accused Henry of the sexual assault proceeded to file a civil case against him in the Supreme Court of British Columbia. On January 29, 2025, the Supreme Court found Henry liable, on a balance of probabilities, for the sexual assaults committed against the 5 Plaintiffs. Judge Miriam Gropper awarded $375,000 to each of the 5 Plaintiffs in general and aggravated damages. Gropper stressed that the burden of proof was lower in this case than in the criminal case and that her ruling did not imply that the decision to quash Henry's conviction was wrong.

== See also ==
- Overturned convictions in Canada#Ivan Henry
