= Donald Marshall Jr. =

Mi'kmaq man wrongly convicted of murder (1953–2009)

- Born: 13 September 1953; Sydney, Nova Scotia, Canada
- Died: 6 August 2009 (aged 55); Sydney, Nova Scotia
- Known for: Wrongful murder conviction
- Father: Donald Marshall Sr.

Donald Marshall Jr. (13 September 1953 – 6 August 2009) was a Miꞌkmaw man who was wrongly convicted of murder. The case inspired a number of questions about the fairness of the Canadian justice system, especially given that Marshall was Aboriginal; as the Canadian Broadcasting Corporation put it, "The name Donald Marshall is almost synonymous with 'wrongful conviction' and the fight for native justice in Canada." The case inspired the Michael Harris book, Justice Denied: The Law Versus Donald Marshall and the subsequent film Justice Denied. His father, Donald Marshall Sr., was grand chief of the Mi'kmaq Nation at the time.

== Early life ==
Marshall was born on 13 September 1953 on the Membertou First Nation in Sydney, Nova Scotia. He was the oldest of 13 children of Donald Marshall Sr., the Grand Chief of the Mi'kmaq, and his wife Caroline Googoo.

== Wrongful conviction ==
Marshall was sentenced to life imprisonment for murdering his acquaintance Sandy Seale in 1971. Marshall, a Mi'kmaq, and Seale, a boy of African descent, both 17 years old, had been walking around Wentworth Park in Sydney, Nova Scotia during the late evening with the intent to "roll a drunk" as stated in his trial. They confronted and panhandled Roy Ebsary and Jimmy MacNeil, two older men they encountered in the park. A short scuffle occurred and Seale fell, mortally wounded by a knife blow from Ebsary. Ebsary never admitted that he had stabbed Seale and then lied about his role to the police who immediately focused on Marshall, who was 'known to them' from previous incidents. Police speculated that Marshall, in a rage, had murdered Seale.

Marshall spent 11 years in prison before being acquitted by the Nova Scotia Court of Appeal in 1983. A witness came forward to say he had seen another man stab Seale, and several prior witness statements pinpointing Marshall were recanted. In this appeal, which acquitted him of the previous murder charge, Marshall was assumed to have lied in his first trial about his and Seale's activities on the night of Seale's death. The accusation was that he and Seale had actually approached Ebsary with the intention of robbing him when they were in the park that night. Ebsary was subsequently tried and convicted of manslaughter. When Marshall's conviction was overturned, the presiding judge placed some blame on Marshall for the miscarriage of justice, calling him "the author of his own misfortune." This was viewed as a "serious and fundamental error" by the Royal Commission report. Anne Derrick, Q.C., well-known social justice advocate lawyer, worked as Marshall's counsel, and Order of Canada recipient Clayton Ruby was co-counsel for Marshall, along with Anne Derrick, during the 1989 Royal Commission on Marshall's prosecution.

The Crown Counsel's failure to provide full disclosure (contradictory and coerced statements by witnesses, because they thought the evidence not provided had no bearing in the case) brought about changes in the Canadian rules of evidence regarding disclosure. The prosecution must provide full disclosure without determination on what may be useful to the defense (that is the defense's duty to decide).

== Compensation and aftermath ==
A separate Royal Commission in 1990, headed by Justice Gregory T. Evans, concluded in June of that year to increase Marshall’s compensation from CA$270,000 to a lifetime pension of CA$1.5 million. His conviction resulted in changes to the Canada Evidence Act, which was amended so that any evidence obtained must be presented to the defense on disclosure. Prior to this case, Crown Prosecutor had the discretion to present what they determined to be pertinent to a case. After 1983, the Crown Prosecutor must provide all evidence with no determination on its usefulness. The rationale of the law is that it is more appropriate for the defense to determine what may or may not assist an accused.

In response, a Royal Commission was formed to investigate what had caused the miscarriage of justice; this led to an influential case on judicial independence in Canada, Mackeigan v. Hickman.

== Fishing rights battle ==
Subsequently, Marshall reached prominence as the primary petitioner in the landmark Supreme Court of Canada case R. v. Marshall [1999] 3 SCR 456 regarding treaty rights allowing Aboriginal people to catch and sell fish under the relevant treaties. In response to a charge from the Canadian government of catching and selling eels without a license, Marshall argued that his treaty rights superseded federal fishing regulations. The treaty right was established, and Marshall was acquitted.

== Subsequent arrests ==
In January 2006, Marshall faced charges of attempted murder, uttering death threats and dangerous driving following a New Year's Eve party in which Marshall was accused of attacking a man with a vehicle. The charges were dropped after both men agreed to participate in a restorative justice meeting.

In 2008, Marshall faced charges of assault against his wife, uttering threats against his wife and her ex-husband and breach of an undertaking.

== Death ==
Marshall died 6 August 2009, in Sydney, Nova Scotia, from complications of a 2003 lung transplant.

== Legacy ==
The Membertou First Nation unveiled a statue to honour Marshall in 2010 outside the Membertou Trade and Convention Centre in Sydney, Nova Scotia.

Daniel N. Paul has suggested renaming the Cornwallis Square in Halifax, Nova Scotia the Donald Marshall Jr. Memorial Park and replacing the statue of Edward Cornwallis with one of Donald Marshall Jr.

== See also ==
- Overturned convictions in Canada
- List of miscarriage of justice cases
- Willie Nepoose
