= Martensville satanic sex scandal =

Child sexual abuse scandal in Canada

The Martensville satanic sex scandal, also known as the Martensville Nightmare occurred in Martensville, Saskatchewan, Canada. There were two similar events around the same time where an allegation of child sex abuse escalated into claims of satanic ritual abuse. The more widely known of the two is the Martensville Daycare Scandal, and the lesser known but earlier story is of the Foster Parent Scandal in nearby Saskatoon.

The Martensville satanic sex scandal is the subject of season 6 of the CBC podcast Uncover, titled Satanic Panic.

== History ==
In 1992, a mother in Martensville, Saskatchewan, alleged that a local woman who ran a babysitting service and day care centre in her home had sexually abused her child. Police began an investigation and allegations began to snowball. More than a dozen persons, including five police officers from three different forces, ultimately faced over 100 charges connected with running a Satanic cult called The Brotherhood of The Ram, which allegedly practiced ritualized sexual abuse of numerous children at a "Devil Church".

The son of the day care owner was tried and found guilty of molestation, but not of sexual abuse on the scale that had been alleged. A Royal Canadian Mounted Police task force subsequently took over the investigation, concluding that the original inquiry was motivated by "emotional hysteria." Additionally, the interviews of the children were found to be mismanaged: the questions were leading, and the children were praised for giving incriminating answers. In 2003, the defendants sued for wrongful prosecution, with Ron and Linda Sterling receiving C$924,000 in 2004. John Popowich, one of the five police officers falsely accused, received a settlement of $1.3 million for malicious prosecution.

== Saskatoon foster parent scandal ==
In nearby Saskatoon in 1993, a similar case occurred that also involved children in care, allegations of sexual abuse, and allegations of satanic cults and rituals. The events of the case predate the Martensville events, but were overshadowed by the media coverage of the Martensville case. That case was centred around the Klassen family and three children in their foster home. The two cases are often confused as a result of their neighbouring location and time of the events.

== See also ==
- Overturned convictions in Canada
- Mass hysteria
