= Goudge Inquiry =

The Inquiry into Pediatric Forensic Pathology in Ontario, commonly known as the Goudge Inquiry, was created to address serious concerns over the way criminally suspicious deaths involving children are handled by the Province of Ontario in Canada. The inquiry was primarily the result of evidence that arose in regards to discredited pathologist Charles Smith.

== Creation ==
By 2005, the existence of serious and disturbing errors in several criminal investigations into suspicious deaths involving children had been confirmed. While there appeared to be significant problems in the entire system, the majority of cases being re-investigated involved those for which Charles Smith, of the Hospital for Sick Children in Toronto, had provided his expert opinion.

In response to a shockingly large number of wrongful convictions (for murder, sexual assault, and infanticide, to name but a few), the provincial government directed that an inquiry be held to determine the state of the Forensic Pathology system in Ontario. The goal of this inquiry was to come up with suggestions to improve the system, which the province was capable of implementing, in order to ensure that these errors would not be repeated.

== Inquiry and report ==
Ontario Court of Appeal judge Stephen Goudge was named as commissioner. He heard evidence from November 2007 through the early months of 2008.

His report was released on October 1, 2008. Goudge found that Smith had "actively misled" superiors and made "false and misleading" statements in court.

In his report, among the host of problems he addressed, he took issue with:

- the qualifications of practitioners in the field of Pediatric Forensic Pathology – specifically the problems with a lack of a formal certification program in Pediatric Forensic Pathology;
- training of practitioners that failed to place a heavy emphasis on the forensic aspects of pediatric forensic pathology;
- a lack of knowledge of the legal system on the part of those conducting autopsies as part of criminal investigations and, as a result, a fundamental lack of appreciation of the proper role the Forensic Pathologist plays in the criminal justice system; and
- an improper system of checks-and-balances leading to a total lack of oversight into the work of those who make the determinations that often lead to serious criminal convictions.

== Aftermath ==
On October 23, 2008, the Government of Ontario announced it would accept all legislative changes recommended in the report and introduced a bill in the Legislative Assembly of Ontario to implement the changes. One change was the introduction of the Ontario Forensic Pathology Service, which serves as the head for all forensic pathology investigations in the province.
