= Willie Nepoose =

Wilson "Willie" Nepoose (died c. 1997–1998) was a Samson Cree man who was wrongly convicted of second-degree murder in 1987. The conviction was overturned in 1992 after an inquiry that revealed perjury by the witnesses, poor police work, withheld evidence, and systemic prejudice against First Nations people in Canada.

== History ==
Nepoose was a member of the Samson Cree Nation in the Alberta unincorporated community of Hobbema (since 2014 called Maskwacis). Before the murder, Nepoose was a drifter and alcoholic who had several criminal convictions, including two sex related offences, four offences involving violence or threats of violence, nineteen property related offences, four drunken driving offences, at least four instances of parole violations and fifteen other assorted criminal convictions.

In mid-1986, the 43-year-old First Nations woman Rose Marie Desjarlais of Edmonton was strangled to death. Her naked body was discovered in a gravel pit near Ponoka, Alberta. She had led a troubled life: she had been orphaned, struggled with alcoholism, and often depended on welfare. Nepoose was arrested a few weeks later that July. No physical evidence tied Nepoose to the case, and the trial relied on testimony from two women who stated they had witnessed Nepoose murder the woman. The court rejected Nepoose's alibi that he was drinking with his brothers in a hotel at the time of the murder, as the room was not registered in Nepoose's name. Nepoose was given a life sentence.

== Overturning ==
Nepoose was held in Prince Albert Federal Penitentiary in Saskatchewan while his sister-in-law Debbie and brother Lester continued to try to prove his brother's innocence. They hired former Royal Canadian Mounted Police (RCMP) officer Jack Ramsay to investigate, who found instances of perjury and poor police work in the case, including "illegal threats and intimidation tactics" to get the witnesses to perjure themselves. He asserted prejudice against First Nations people and that if Nepoose were white the "case would never have gone to court", comparing the case to that of Donald Marshall Jr., a Nova Scotian Mi'kmaq also wrongly convicted of murder.

Police were shown to have kept contradictory testimony from both the prosecution and defense. The witness Delma Bull stated she had been pressured into lying about witnessing the murder and a welfare check proved she could not have been at the scene.

The case drew media attention, such as from the Edmonton Sun and the conservative newsmagazine Alberta Report, which ran a three-page cover story on the case titled "White Man's Justice: New Evidence: Maybe Wilson Nepoose didn't murder anybody after all" in its 24 September 1990 issue.

An inquiry in 1991 led to Nepoose's conviction being overturned in 1992, though as a new trial was never initiated Nepoose was never exonerated. Nepoose suffered from depression and at one point visited the Alberta Hospital mental health facility in Ponoka. He was preparing for a civil suit against the RCMP when on 28 December 1997 he went missing after telling his brother Lester he needed time to himself. He was reported missing on 4 January 1998 and his skeletal remains were discovered later in the year 300 m from his sister's home near Hobbema. Desjarlais's murder remained unsolved as of 2011.
