= Robert Baltovich =

Canadian man wrongfully convicted of murder

- Born: July 17, 1965 (age 61)
- Education: University of Toronto
- Known for: Wrongly convicted of murder

Robert Baltovich (born July 17, 1965) is a Canadian man who was wrongly convicted in 1992 of the murder of his girlfriend, Elizabeth Bain, in Scarborough, Ontario, Canada. He spent eight years in prison and nearly another decade trying to clear his name, before being found not guilty in a retrial on April 22, 2008.

== Elizabeth Bain murder ==
On June 8, 1990, Baltovich graduated with a degree in psychology and history from the University of Toronto Scarborough. There he met fellow student Elizabeth Bain and a relationship developed. Bain disappeared on June 19, 1990, after telling her mother she was going to "check the tennis schedule" on campus. On June 22, her car was found with a large bloodstain in the back seat, later identified to be Bain's blood. Her body was never found. Detectives Brian Raybould and Steve Reesor took over the case.

== First trial and conviction ==
On November 19, 1990, Baltovich was arrested and charged with First-degree murder. Justice John O'Driscoll presided over his case, with crown prosecutors John McMahon and Paul Amenta. His trial lawyers were William Gatward and Michael Engel. His case continued in the courts for several years, during which he consistently maintained his innocence. His lawyers suggested that the so-called "Scarborough rapist", the term used for the then unidentified serial killer Paul Bernardo, might be responsible for the murder.

On March 31, 1992, Baltovich was convicted of second-degree murder.

== Appeal, retrial and acquittal ==
On December 2, 2004, the Court of Appeal for Ontario set aside the conviction, delivering what news reports called "a scathing attack" on the conduct of the original trial judge. This fell short of the acquittal that Baltovich's counsel had argued for. On July 15, 2005, Ontario's Ministry of the Attorney-General announced that Baltovich would face a new trial on charges of second-degree murder, at an unspecified date, and remain free on bail in the meantime. During that time, Baltovich worked as a librarian for the Government of Ontario.

In 1999, Baltovich got in contact with the Association in Defense of the Wrongly Convicted, now Innocence Canada. James Lockyer and Joanne McLean took over his case and filed for an appeal. On March 31, 2000, Baltovich was released on bail, pending the outcome of his appeal. In September 2004 his appeal was finally processed. Once more his case gained national attention when his lawyers alleged that he had been wrongfully convicted and that Bernardo was guilty of Bain's murder.

They pointed to circumstantial evidence suggesting links to Bernardo, evidence not available during Baltovich's original trial because Bernardo's identity as the "Scarborough rapist" was then unknown. Asked about the matter, Bernardo denied involvement in Bain's disappearance. Baltovich's defense also pointed to issues with hypnotizing eyewitnesses to 'help with their memory'. The case R v. Trochym (2007) deemed that any evidence obtained through hypnosis is inadmissible in court.

On March 31, 2008, jury selection began in the second-degree murder trial. The trial, slated to begin in Toronto on April 14, 2008, was delayed, with the Crown (prosecution) giving no reason. When the trial resumed, the Crown declined to call any of the more than 50 witnesses they had planned, citing "recent developments, including the cumulative effect of the pre-trial evidentiary rulings rendered to date in this case, other evidentiary issues, and changes to case law". With no Crown case, the judge directed the jury to make a finding of not guilty on April 22, 2008.

== Civil Suit ==
In January 2010, the Attorney-General concluded that the payment of financial compensation was not appropriate.

On April 21, 2010, a civil suit alleging malicious prosecution, negligent investigation and negligent representation was filed on behalf of Baltovich. The defendants named include John McMahon, now a judge with the Superior Court of Ontario, and Paul Amenta, a practicing Crown Attorney in Toronto. Det. Sgt. Brian Raybould and Det. Sgt. Steve Reesor, the two lead detectives in the case, are also named as defendants.

In May 2014, Baltovich's lawyers applied to amend his statement of claim. Media reported that during examinations for discovery related to Baltovich's civil suit, previously undisclosed forensic evidence had surfaced indicating that Det. Sgt. Brian Raybould had met with two forensic experts three days after Baltovich's arrest in November 1990, during which time he was told that the police theory of the crime - that Baltovich had killed Elizabeth Bain on June 19, 1990, hidden her body nearby in Colonel Danforth Park and that he had returned three days later to retrieve her body and drive it out of Scarborough in her car - was not supported by the forensic evidence found in Bain's car and that, according to Baltovich's lawyers, the theory presented at Baltovich's first trial was "flawed and untenable." It is also alleged that Det. Sgt. Brian Raybould doctored his notes in an effort to conceal the existence of the meeting by removing pages referencing the meeting and replacing them with another page from his notes from a later date.

== See also ==
- Overturned convictions in Canada
- List of miscarriage of justice cases
