= Journal of Investigative Psychology and Offender Profiling =

- Discipline: Criminology, investigative psychology
- Language: English
- Edited by: Donna Youngs

Publication details
- History: 2004-present
- Publisher: John Wiley & Sons on behalf of the International Academy of Investigative Psychology
- Frequency: Triannual
- Open access: Hybrid
- Impact factor: 1.700 (2020)

Standard abbreviations
- ISO 4: J. Investig. Psychol. Offender Profiling

Indexing
- ISSN: 1544-4759 (print); 1544-4767 (web)
- LCCN: 2003212632
- OCLC no.: 1027992489

Links
- Journal homepage; Online access; Online archive

The Journal of Investigative Psychology and Offender Profiling is a peer-reviewed online-only academic journal covering the behavioral sciences as they relate to criminology and the legal system. It was established in 2004 and is published three times per year by John Wiley & Sons. Originally published both online and in print, it became online-only in 2011. It is the official journal of the International Academy of Investigative Psychology and the editor-in-chief is Donna Youngs (University of Huddersfield). According to the Journal Citation Reports, the journal has a 2020 impact factor of 1.700, ranking it 51st out of 69 journals in the category "Criminology & Penology" and 63rd out of 83 in the category "Psychology Applied".
