= Réjean Hinse =

Réjean Hinse (born c. 1938) was wrongly convicted of taking part in the armed robbery on 14 December 1961 of a general store in Mont-Laurier, Quebec. In 1964 he was sentenced to fifteen years in prison for aggravated robbery. In April 2011, after a legal battle lasting nearly fifty years, Hinse was awarded $13.1 million compensation, payable by the Quebec and Canadian Federal governments, the largest wrongful conviction award in Canadian history.

Hinse spent three years on remand and served another five years after sentence. He campaigned to establish his innocence based on the fact that he had been in Montreal, over two hundred kilometres away, at the time the crime was committed. In 1989 the Quebec Police Commission concluded that Hinse was the victim of "a botched investigation". Although his conviction was quashed by the Quebec Court of Appeal in 1994, partly because of new evidence, and a stay of proceedings was ordered, Hinse continued to argue his innocence. In 1997 he was acquitted by the Supreme Court of Canada, which ruled that evidence presented at his trial was insufficient to convict him of aggravated robbery.

Despite Hinse's acquittal by the Supreme Court of Canada, the Quebec and federal governments refused to acknowledge his innocence. He sued for compensation in a civil court case that went to trial in 2010. Judgment was handed down by the Quebec Superior Court on 14 April 2011. The Canadian federal government was ordered to pay Hinse $8.6 million, subject to appeal. The Government of Quebec reached a settlement prior to the judgment involving payment of $4.5 million to Hinse.

After the judgment, Hinse used a copy of Edvard Munch's painting The Scream to illustrate his psychological condition in prison. He described how "After I was sentenced ... the headaches were unbearable. The only way to cope with the pain was to keep banging my head against the stone wall - a little harder, then a little harder still, until the pain I was inflicting on myself became more intense than the other pain."

The attorney general of Canada was not part of the settlement that had resulted in a $4.5 million payment, and Hinse went ahead with a separate lawsuit against that official. In 2015, the Supreme Court of Canada decided against Hinse: "In this case, [Hinse] has failed to prove, on a balance of probabilities, that the minister acted in bad faith or with serious recklessness in reviewing his applications for mercy...."

== See also ==
- Overturned convictions in Canada
- List of miscarriage of justice cases
