= Guy Paul Morin =

Canadian wrongly convicted of a 1984 murder

- Born: 1961 (age 64–65)
- Known for: Wrongfully convicted of the rape and murder of a neighbour's child

Guy Paul Morin (pronounced "more-AN") is a Canadian who was wrongfully convicted of the October 1984 rape and murder of his nine-year-old next-door neighbour, Christine Jessop of Queensville, north of Toronto, Ontario. DNA testing led to a subsequent overturning of this verdict. On October 15, 2020, the Toronto Police Service announced a DNA match identifying Calvin Hoover as the one whose semen was recovered from Jessop's underwear. Hoover committed suicide in 2015.

The Morin family had lived in Queensville since 1978. Morin had four sisters; his father Alphonse was an engineer, having retired from his teaching position at Seneca College in 1982. Morin's mother, Ida, was a retired teacher who continued to work as a supply teacher.

After high school, Morin "attended various courses in auto upholstery, spray painting, air conditioning, refrigeration and gas fitting. In July 1984, he commenced employment with a firm known as Interiors International Limited, furniture manufacturers. He worked as a finishing sander and was employed there in October 1984 [...] In December 1984 [Morin] left his employment to help his father with the renovation work being done to their home". Guy Paul Morin was an avid beekeeper and a talented musician. He played saxophone and clarinet in various community bands, winning numerous awards and competitions. His sister Denise Kowalski described him as "extremely talented", playing numerous musical instruments.

In October 1984, only Guy lived at home with his parents. The Morin family and the Jessop family had a neighbourly relationship. Janet Jessop, Christine's mother, asked Guy's parents to keep an eye on Christine from time to time, which they agreed to do. The day of Christine's disappearance, Morin's time card confirmed that he left work that day at 3:32 p.m. Morin stopped in Newmarket to buy groceries on his way home from work, arriving home in Queensville between 5:00 and 5:30 p.m.: "As he walked towards his house, his brother-in-law was leaving. They spoke briefly. M's parents and his sister, Yvette, were at home. He carried the groceries into the kitchen and then, he said, he napped until approximately 6:30 p.m. He had supper with his parents after which he worked with his father outside the house into the evening, using makeshift floodlights".

== Murder of Christine Jessop ==
On October 3, 1984, Jessop's mother Janet and elder brother, Kenney, had travelled to Toronto's East Detention Centre, where her father Bob was in custody. Bob Jessop had been incarcerated two weeks earlier for misappropriation of funds. Her mother thought that, at 9 years old, Christine was too young to visit the detention centre. Despite her protests, Christine was left behind in Queensville to attend school as usual. Christine returned home from school that afternoon on the school bus. She dropped her backpack off at home, but was not there when her mother and brother returned home shortly after 4 p.m. Jessop went from her home to the variety store close to her home. The shopkeeper said that Christine came to the store alone between 3:30 and 4:00 p.m., bought bubble gum and left a minute or so later. Christine was supposed to meet a friend from school at a nearby park, but failed to show up.

When her mother arrived home she found Christine's school bag on the counter. In early evening after her mother had telephoned Christine's friends and searched for the little girl herself, police were called. Her body was discovered on December 31, nearly three months later. She had been sexually assaulted and murdered.

== Trials ==
An officer from York Regional Police visited the Morin home in the hours after Christine's disappearance to ask Ida Morin whether anyone had seen Christine that day, or noticed anything unusual. During that conversation, the officer noted that Guy "stared straight ahead, showing no apparent interest in the conversation"; this was later interpreted as evidence of his guilt. In early 1985, the FBI offered a profile of the perpetrator: an intelligent white male who was a resident of Queensville, age 19–26. Police turned their attention to Morin on 14 February 1985, after Christine's mother, Janet Jessop, described Morin to police as a “weird-type guy” who played the clarinet. On February 19, police set up surveillance of the Morin home. Two York Region police officers interviewed him on 22 February. A raid was conducted at the Morin home on April 22, 1985, and Morin, age 25, was arrested for Christine's murder.

Morin was acquitted at his first trial in 1986. The Crown exercised its right to appeal the verdict on the grounds that the trial judge made a fundamental error in the charge to the jury. In 1987 the Court of Appeal for Ontario ordered a new trial. The retrial was delayed until 1992 by Morin's own appeals based on the Crown's non-disclosure of exculpatory evidence and by other issues, including the double jeopardy rule.

The second trial ran for nine months during 1992— then the longest murder trial in Canadian history— ending with Morin convicted and sentenced to life imprisonment. Unlike others convicted of murdering children after sexually abusing them, he was kept in the general population throughout his time in prison. He was released on bail, pending his appeal in February 1993; until his release, he was held at Kingston Penitentiary.

== Acquittal and aftermath ==
Improvements in DNA testing led to a test in January 1995 which excluded Morin as the murderer, just days before his appeal was to be heard. On January 23, 1995, Chief Justice Charles Dubin of the Court of Appeal for Ontario allowed the appeal and entered a directed verdict of acquittal in response to the DNA evidence that all parties agreed was accurate. This verdict led to a group of volunteers to form the Association in Defence of the Wrongly Convicted (AIDWYC), now known as Innocence Canada.

An inquiry culminating in the Kaufman Report into Morin's case also uncovered evidence of police and prosecutorial misconduct, and of misrepresentation of forensic evidence by the Ontario Centre of Forensic Sciences. Morin received $1.25 million in compensation from the Ontario government.

== Identification of murderer ==
On October 15, 2020, just days past the 36th anniversary of Jessop's death, police identified Jessop's murderer as Calvin Hoover based on DNA evidence and genetic genealogy. Hoover died by his own hand in 2015. He was 28 in 1984. Police said that he was an associate to the family and had a criminal record that was unrelated to the case. Calvin Hoover, his then-wife Heather and Bob Jessop all worked together at Eastern Independent Telecom. Calvin Hoover was a cable installer, Heather was a dispatcher, and Bob was the "lead hand" of cable installers. Heather Hoover was very close with Janet Jessop. Ken Jessop remembers going to the Hoover family home and the Hoover family coming to the Jessop home for barbecues, birthdays and other events.

== See also ==
- Overturned convictions in Canada
- List of miscarriage of justice cases
