= Miscarriage of justice =

Unfair outcome in trial

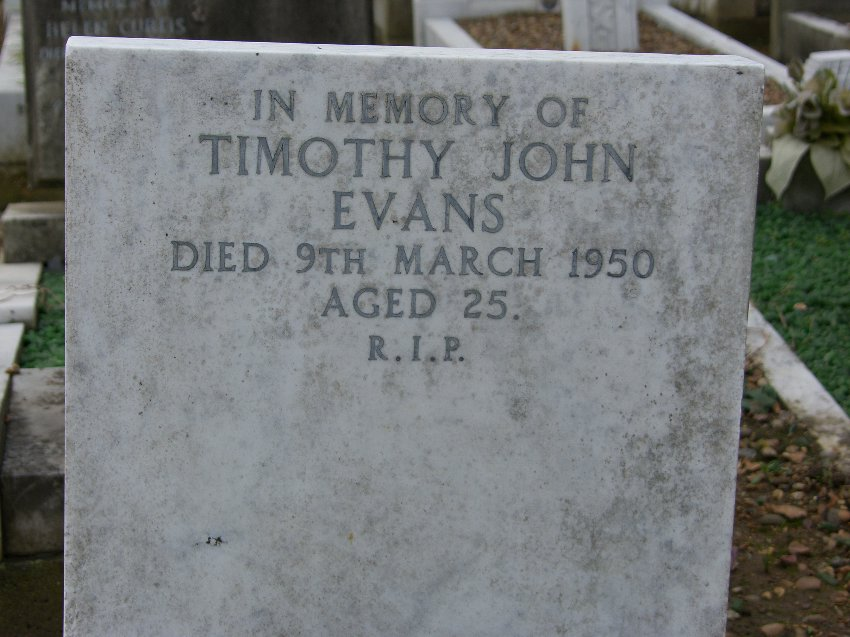
The headstone of Timothy Evans, who was wrongfully convicted and executed for two murders that had been committed by his neighbour John Christie

A miscarriage of justice occurs when an unfair outcome occurs in a criminal or civil proceeding. Examples of miscarriage of justice include conviction of an innocent person, error of impunity, sentencing disparity, and delayed justice.

Innocent people have sometimes ended up in prison for years before their conviction has eventually been overturned. They may be exonerated if new evidence comes to light or it is determined that the police or prosecutor committed some kind of misconduct at the original trial. In some jurisdictions this leads to the payment of compensation.

Academic studies have found that the main factors contributing to miscarriages of justice are: eyewitness misidentification; faulty forensic analysis; false confessions by vulnerable suspects; perjury and lies stated by witnesses; misconduct by police, prosecutors or judges; and/or ineffective assistance of counsel (e.g., inadequate defense strategies by the defendant's or respondent's legal team).

== Prevalence ==
There are two main methods for estimating the prevalence of wrongful convictions, by examining cases in which an exoneration has occurred, or by analyzing self-reports of false confessions.

=== Exoneration ===
The first is the number of exonerations where the guilty verdict has been vacated or annulled by a judge or higher court after new evidence has been brought forward proving the "guilty" person is in fact innocent. Since 1989, the Innocence Project has helped overturn 375 convictions of American prisoners with updated DNA evidence; however, DNA testing occurs in only 5 to 10% of all criminal cases, and exonerations achieved by the Innocence Project are limited to murder and rape cases. This raises the possibility that there may be many more wrongful convictions for which there is no evidence available to exonerate the defendant. Studies cited by the Innocence Project estimate that between 2.3% and 5% of all prisoners in the U.S. are innocent; however, a 2017 study looking at convictions in the state of Virginia during the 1970s and 1980s and matching them to later DNA analysis estimates a rate of wrongful conviction at 11.6%. A 2014 study published in Proceedings of the National Academy of Sciences made a conservative estimate that 4.1% of inmates awaiting execution on death row in the United States are innocent.

=== Self-report ===
The second method for estimating wrongful convictions involves self-report. Researchers ask prisoners whether they have ever confessed to a crime which they did not commit. Self-report allows examination of any and all crimes where wrongful conviction may have occurred, not just murder and rape cases where DNA is available. Two Icelandic studies based on self-report conducted ten years apart found the rates of false confession to be 12.2% and 24.4%, respectively. These figures provide a proxy for miscarriages of justice because erroneous confessions are likely to lead to wrongful convictions. A 2021 Scottish study found the rate of self-reported false confessions among a group of inmates in one prison was 33.4%.

Up to 10,000 people may be wrongfully convicted of serious crimes in the United States each year. According to Professor Boaz Sangero of the College of Law and Business in Ramat Gan, most wrongful convictions in Israel relate to less serious crimes than major felonies such as rape and murder, as judicial systems are less careful in dealing with those cases.

== Contributing factors ==
Academics believe that six main factors contribute to miscarriages of justice. These include eyewitness misidentification, faulty forensic analysis, false confessions by vulnerable suspects, perjury and lies told by witnesses, misconduct by police, prosecutors or judges and inadequate defense strategies put forward by the defendant's legal team.

=== Unreliability of eyewitness testimony ===
Eyewitness identifications are notoriously unreliable, contributing to 70% of wrongful convictions. Starting in the 1970s, psychologists studying memory formation and retention found that the way police lineups are conducted can alter an eyewitness's memory of the suspect and this often leads to misidentification. Witnesses also have considerable difficulty making accurate identifications with suspects from different ethnic groups such that "the rate of mistaken identification is significantly higher than most people tend to believe". Elizabeth Loftus, a leading researcher in the field, says memory is so unreliable "the result can be a highly confident witness testifying in a persuasive manner at trial about a detail that is completely false".

=== Forensic mistakes ===
==== Contamination ====
Wrongful convictions can also occur when items which become evidence at crime scenes become contaminated in the process of packaging, collection and transportation to a secured facility or laboratory. Contamination can be introduced unintentionally by material that was not present when the crime was committed by anyone entering the crime scene after the event – by uninvolved witnesses who may become suspects, and by emergency responders, fire fighters, police officers and crime scene investigators themselves. If proper protocols are not followed, evidence can also be contaminated when it is being analyzed or stored. A miscarriage of justice can occur when procedures to prevent contamination are not carried out carefully and accurately.

==== Faulty analysis ====
The Innocence Project says 44% of wrongful convictions are the result of faulty forensic analysis. This occurs when forensic experts inadvertently or deliberately misrepresent the significance, validity or reliability of scientific evidence. Over the years, misrepresentations have been made in the arenas of serological analysis, microscopic hair comparison, and the analysis of bite marks, shoe prints, soil, fiber, and fingerprints.

==== Overconfident experts ====
Overly confident testimony by expert witnesses can also lead to miscarriages of justice. The credibility of expert witnesses depends on numerous factors – in particular, their credentials, personal likability and self-confidence which all impact on how believable they are. The confidence with which experts present their evidence has also been noted to influence jurors, who tend to assume that a witness who is anxious or nervous is lying. The manner in which experts testify may have a greater impact on judges and lawyers who prefer experts who provide clear, unequivocal conclusions.

The credentials and reputation of the expert also have a significant impact on juries. For example, Charles Smith was head of the Ontario Pediatric Forensic Pathology Unit from 1982 and the most highly regarded specialist in his field. His testimony led to the convictions of thirteen women whose children died in unexplained circumstance before it came to light that he had "a thing against people who hurt children", and "was on a crusade and acted more like a prosecutor" than a pathologist. An inquiry into his conduct concluded in October 2008 that Smith "actively misled" his superiors, "made false and misleading statements" in court and exaggerated his expertise in trials.

=== False confessions ===
The possibility that innocent people would admit to a crime they did not commit seems unlikely – and yet this occurs so often, the Innocence Project found false confessions contribute to approximately 25% of wrongful convictions in murder and rape cases. Certain suspects are more vulnerable to making a false confession under police pressure. This includes individuals who are intellectually impaired, and those who suffer from mental illness. Saul Kassin, a leading expert on false confessions, says that young people are also particularly vulnerable to confessing, especially when stressed, tired, or traumatized.

==== Coercive interrogation techniques ====
Police often use coercive manipulation techniques when conducting interrogations in hopes of obtaining a confession. In the United States, one of these is known as the Reid Technique after the officer who developed it, John Reid. Introduced in the 1940s and 50s, the strategy relies on deception, coercion and aggressive confrontation to secure confessions. It became the leading interrogation method used by law enforcement throughout the United States and has led to many confessions by innocent people. As of 2014, this technique was still popular with police interrogators even though the strategy produces less information from suspects, provides fewer true confessions and more false confessions than less confrontational interviewing techniques.

=== Perjury and false accusations ===
Witnesses in police investigations may lie for a variety of reasons including: personal ill-will towards the defendant, the desire to be paid, the desire to get a deal from prosecutors or police, or an effort to deflect attention from a person's own involvement in a crime. An innocent person is more likely to be convicted when one or more witnesses have an incentive to testify, and those incentives are not disclosed to the jury. According to the National Registry of Exonerations, 57% of cases where the convicted person was eventually exonerated involves perjury or false accusations.

=== Prosecutorial misconduct ===
This occurs in numerous ways including the concealment or destruction of exculpatory evidence; the failure to disclose exculpatory evidence to the defence; the failure to reveal that certain witnesses have been paid to testify; and the planting of incriminating evidence. An Innocence Project study found that 25% of DNA exonerations involved testimony that was known to be false by the police and another 11% involved the undisclosed use of coerced witness testimony. In other words, over one third of these wrongful convictions involved prosecutorial misconduct.

==== Biased justice ====
Confirmation bias is a psychological phenomenon whereby people tend to seek and interpret information in ways that support existing beliefs. Two inter-related mechanisms tend to operate: it begins with a biased interpretation of whatever information is available, followed by selectively searching for information which supports this interpretation. With this, any information that contradicts preexisting beliefs is more likely to be ignored, dismissed as false, or twisted to fit an agenda. In police investigations, this comes into play when detectives identify a suspect early in an investigation, come to believe he or she is guilty, and then ignore or downplay other evidence that points to someone else or doesn't fit their hypothesis about what occurred.

A number of factors contribute to this process. First, police officers often have heavy workloads and, in high-profile cases, often come under considerable pressure to catch the perpetrator as soon as possible. This may encourage a rush to judgement – in a process described by psychologists as involving a high need for cognitive closure (NFC) – the desire for a clear-cut solution which avoids confusion and ambiguity. Second, after spending considerable time and resources trying to build a case against a particular suspect, it becomes difficult for police to admit they may be going down the wrong track. The embarrassment and loss of prestige that follows from admitting erroneous decisions may motivate investigators to continue down a chosen path and disregard evidence that points in a different direction.

Finally, criminal investigations are generally theory-driven activities. Investigators tend to evaluate evidence based on their preliminary theories or hypotheses about how, and by whom, a crime was committed. Because of the pressures described above, such hypotheses are sometimes based on the expectations and preconceptions of the investigators rather than on solid facts. A study in the Journal of Investigative Psychology and Offender Profiling found that "criminal investigations which aim at generating evidence confirming an ill-founded hypothesis pose serious threats both to the security of innocent citizens and to the effectiveness of the law-enforcement system".

==== Noble cause corruption ====
Police may become convinced a particular suspect is guilty but not have sufficient evidence to prove it. Sometimes they may plant evidence in order to secure a conviction because they believe it is in the public interest, or that there is a greater good, in convicting a particular person. In other words, they believe that the ends (or the outcome) justifies the means. This is known as noble cause corruption.

==== Plea bargaining ====
Another technique used by police is plea bargaining whereby the prosecutor provides a concession to the defendant in exchange for a plea of guilt. This generally occurs when the defendant pleads guilty to a less serious charge, or to one of several charges, in return for the dismissal of the main charge; or it may mean that the defendant pleads guilty to the main charge in return for a more lenient sentence.

== Compensation for wrongful conviction ==
Article 14(6) of the International Covenant on Civil and Political Rights (ICCPR) states that when a miscarriage of justice has occurred and the defendant's conviction has been reversed or they have been pardoned, "the person who has suffered punishment as a result of such conviction shall be compensated according to law". The right to compensation is also authorized by Article 3 of Protocol No. 7 to the European Convention for the Protection of Human Rights and Fundamental Freedoms and Article 10 of the American Convention on Human Rights.

Many jurisdictions worldwide provide some kind of remedy for those wrongfully convicted. As victims often face a variety of severe negative psychological, social, and financial consequences, they may be offered an opportunity to seek financial compensation; however, most jurisdictions require a separate inquiry post-exoneration to determine the degree of compensation the victim is entitled to. While most societies agree that a person who did not commit a crime and served a long imprisonment is entitled to significant compensation, it may not be justified, for example, to award compensation to a person who is still believed to have committed a prima facie criminal act but whose conviction was overturned due to technicalities. Four broad approaches allow for the payment of compensation following a miscarriage of justice: tort liability in common law; claims for a breach of constitutional or human rights; statutory relief where specific legislation exists to compensate individuals who are wrongfully convicted; and non-statutory relief by way of ex-gratia schemes based on the largesse of the government.

In a study of different approaches to the payment of compensation in the United States, the United Kingdom, Canada, Australia and New Zealand, only the US and the UK have statutory schemes in place. In the United States, the federal government, the District of Columbia, and 38 states have such legislation on their statutes. Twelve states have no laws requiring compensation to be paid. However, each state differs widely in regard to eligibility requirements, maximum payments, issues concerning factual innocence, the burden of proof, the behavior of the claimant which contributed to the (now overturned) conviction, and the claimant's prior criminal history. In some states, statutes of limitations also applies. The significant benefits of statutory schemes is that they provide money and services in compensation to individuals who have been wrongfully convicted without regard to fault or blame; they do not require claimants to prove how the prosecution or police committed their mistakes.

== Implications ==
The concept of miscarriage of justice has important implications for standard of review, in that an appellate court will often only exercise its discretion to correct a plain error when a miscarriage of justice (or "manifest injustice") would otherwise occur. The risk of miscarriages of justice is often cited as a cause to eliminate the death penalty. When condemned persons are executed before they are determined to have been wrongly convicted, the effect of that miscarriage of justice is irreversible. Wrongly executed people nevertheless occasionally receive posthumous pardons—which essentially void the conviction—or have their convictions quashed. Even when a wrongly convicted person is not executed, years in prison can have a substantial, irreversible effect on the person and their family. The risk of miscarriage of justice is therefore also an argument against long sentences, like a life sentence, and cruel prison conditions.

== Consequences ==
Wrongful convictions appear at first to be "rightful" arrests and subsequent convictions, and also include a public statement about a particular crime having occurred, as well as a particular individual or individuals having committed that crime. If the conviction turns out to be a miscarriage of justice, then one or both of these statements is ultimately deemed to be false. In cases where a large-scale audience is unknowingly witness to a miscarriage of justice, the news-consuming public may develop false beliefs about the nature of crime itself. It may also cause the public to falsely believe that certain types of crime exist, or that certain types of people tend to commit these crimes, or that certain crimes are more commonly prevalent than they actually are. Thus, wrongful convictions can ultimately mold a society's popular beliefs about crime. Because understanding of crime is socially constructed, it has been shaped by many factors other than its actual occurrence.

Mass media may also be faulted for distorting the public perception of crime by over-representing certain races and genders as criminals and victims, and for highlighting more sensational and invigorating types of crimes as being more newsworthy. The way a media presents crime-related issues may have an influence not only on a society's fear of crime but also on its beliefs about the causes of criminal behavior and desirability of one or another approach to crime control. Ultimately, this may have a significant impact on critical public beliefs about emerging forms of crime such as cybercrime, global crime, and terrorism. Some wrongfully sanctioned people join organizations like the Innocence Project and Witness to Innocence to publicly share their stories, as a way to counteract these media distortions and to advocate for various types of criminal justice reform.

There are unfavorable psychological effects to those who were wrongfully sanctioned. In an experiment, participants significantly reduced their pro-social behavior after being wrongfully sanctioned. As a consequence there were negative effects for the entire group. Interviews with 15 wrongfully convicted men in the United States indicate that wrongful convictions impose significant relational and family-related consequences before, during, and after incarceration. These effects appear to develop across three general stages. At the time of conviction, participants and their families experienced shared trauma that disrupted family life. As imprisonment continued, many men—particularly those with fewer socioeconomic resources—reported declining family support, while those who did maintain connections still faced altered family structures that contributed to feelings of isolation. After release, participants often struggled to rebuild relationships, especially with relatives who had withdrawn support or from whom they had grown distant during their incarceration. The extent of wrongful sanctions varies between societies. When a crime occurs and the wrong person is convicted for it, the actual perpetrator goes free and often goes on to commit additional crimes, including hundreds of cases of violent crime. A 2019 study estimated that "the wrong‐person wrongful convictions that occur annually [in the United States] may lead to more than 41,000 additional crimes".

== By country ==
=== Canada ===
A series of miscarriages of justice in Canada have led to reforms of the country's criminal justice system. In 1959, 14-year-old Steven Truscott was convicted of raping and murdering a 12-year-old girl. Originally sentenced to death by hanging, his sentence was commuted to life imprisonment. He was released on parole in 1969, and was freed from his parole restrictions in 1974. In 2007, the Ontario Court of Appeal overturned Truscott's conviction, based on a reexamination of forensic evidence. The government of Ontario awarded him $6.5 million in compensation.

In 1972, Donald Marshall Jr., a Mi'kmaq man, was wrongly convicted of murder. Marshall spent 11 years in jail before being acquitted in 1983. The case led to questions about the fairness of the Canadian justice system, especially given that Marshall was an Aboriginal: as the Canadian Broadcasting Corporation put it, "The name Donald Marshall is almost synonymous with 'wrongful conviction' and the fight for native justice in Canada." Marshall received a lifetime pension of $1.5 million in compensation, and his conviction resulted in changes to the Canada Evidence Act so that any evidence obtained by the prosecution must be presented to the defense on disclosure.

In 1970, David Milgaard was wrongfully convicted for the rape and murder of Gail Miller. He was released in 1992 and compensated $10 million by the Saskatchewan government after having spent 23 years in prison. After being tied to it by DNA evidence, serial rapist Larry Fisher was convicted of the murder in 1999. In 1992, Guy Paul Morin was convicted of the 1984 rape and murder of a 9-year-old girl and was sentenced to life imprisonment. In 1995, new testing of DNA evidence showed Morin could not have been the murderer, and the Ontario Court of Appeal overturned his conviction. The case has been described as "a compendium of official error—from inaccurate eyewitness testimony and police tunnel vision, to scientific bungling and the suppression of evidence." Morin received $1.25 million in compensation from the Ontario government.

=== China ===
A series of wrongful convictions were uncovered in the 2010s which had a large impact on the judicial system and undermined public trust in the Chinese justice system. Zhao Zuohai was one of the wrongful convictions, who had to serve 10 years in prison for a murder he did not commit. The alleged victim that he murdered had returned home and he was released from prison. While he was being released from prison he shared that the police officers and officials repeatedly tortured him because they were trying to extract a confession from him.

=== Italy ===
Enzo Tortora, a TV host on national RAI television, was accused of being a member of the Camorra and drug trafficking. He was arrested in 1983 and sentenced to ten years in jail in 1985 but was acquitted of all charges on appeal in 1986.

=== Netherlands ===
In response to two overturned cases, the Schiedammerpark murder case and the Putten murder, the Netherlands created the "Posthumus I committee" which analyzed what had gone wrong in the Schiedammerpark murder case. The committee concluded that confirmation bias led the police to ignore and misinterpret scientific evidence, specifically DNA. Subsequently, the Posthumus II committee investigated whether injustice occurred in similar cases. The committee received 25 applications from concerned and involved scientists and selected three for further investigation: the Lucia de Berk case, the Ina Post case, and the Enschede incest case. In those three cases, independent researchers (professors Wagenaar, van Koppen, Israëls, Crombag, and Derksen) concluded that confirmation bias and misuse of complex scientific evidence led to miscarriages of justice.

=== New Zealand ===
In the last ten years (as at 2023), nearly 900 people in New Zealand have had their convictions overturned. Compensation for wrongful convictions, wrongful detainment, or false imprisonment is not guaranteed under New Zealand law and only a small fraction of victims are ever compensated. A wait time from arrest to trial of 18 months to 4+ years is common in New Zealand, which means victims of miscarriages of justice can lose years of their lives to systemic failures in New Zealand's justice system.

=== Spain ===
The Constitution of Spain guarantees compensation in cases of miscarriage of justice. This includes those who have been acquitted of their charges or if their case has been dismissed.

=== United Kingdom ===
In the United Kingdom a jailed person, whose conviction is quashed, might be paid compensation for the time they were incarcerated. This is currently limited by statute to a maximum sum of £1,000,000 for those who have been incarcerated for more than ten years and £500,000 for any other cases, Between 2007 and 2023 there could be deductions for the cost of food and accommodation during that time. Richard Foster, the Chairman of the Criminal Cases Review Commission (CCRC), reported in October 2018 that the single biggest cause of miscarriage of justice was the failure to disclose vital evidence. A major factor leading to the abolition of capital punishment for murder in the United Kingdom was the case of Timothy Evans, who was executed in 1950 after being wrongfully convicted of a murder that had been committed by his neighbour.

==== England, Wales and Northern Ireland ====
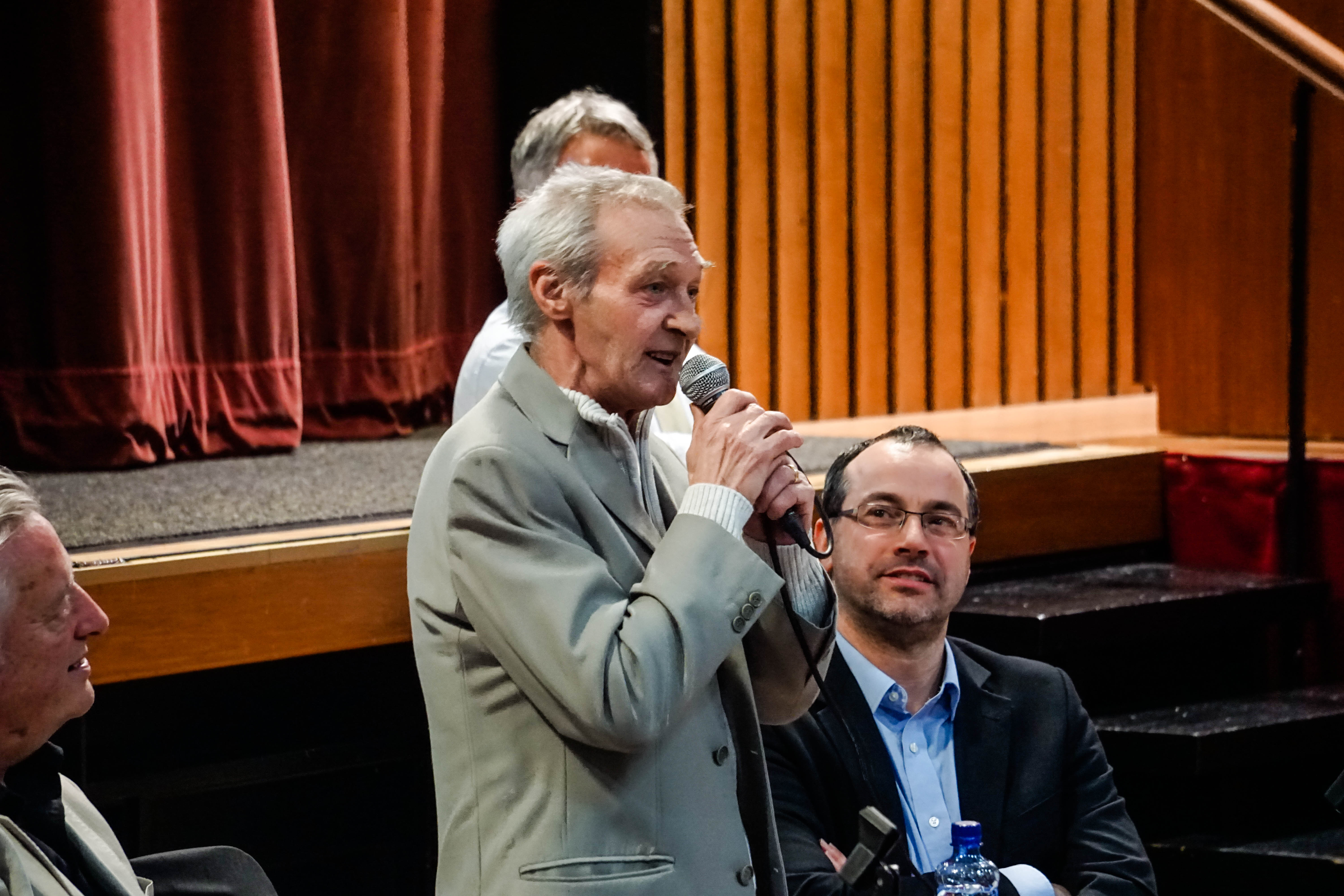
Paddy Hill from the Birmingham Six in 2015. He is seen here addressing an audience as to his advocacy in fighting miscarriages of justice.

Until 2005, the parole system assumed all convicted persons were guilty, and poorly handled those who were not. To be paroled, a convicted person had to sign a document in which, among other things, they confessed to the crime for which they were convicted. Someone who refused to sign this declaration spent longer in jail than someone who signed it. Some wrongly convicted people, such as the Birmingham Six, were refused parole for this reason. In 2005 the system changed, and began to parole prisoners who never admitted guilt.

English law has no official means of correcting a "perverse" verdict (conviction of a defendant on the basis of insufficient evidence). Appeals are based exclusively on new evidence or errors by the judge or prosecution (but not the defence), or jury irregularities. A reversal occurred, however, in the 1930s when William Herbert Wallace was exonerated of the murder of his wife. There is no right to a trial without jury.

During the early 1990s, a series of high-profile cases turned out to be miscarriages of justice. Many resulted from police fabricating evidence to convict people they thought were guilty, or simply to get a high conviction rate. The West Midlands Serious Crime Squad became notorious for such practices, and was disbanded in 1989. In 1997 the Criminal Cases Review Commission was established specifically to examine possible miscarriages of justice. However, it still requires either strong new evidence of innocence, or new proof of a legal error by the judge or prosecution. For example, merely insisting on one's innocence, asserting the jury made an error, or stating there was not enough evidence to prove guilt, is not enough. It is not possible to question the jury's decision or query on what matters it was based. The waiting list for cases to be considered for review is at least two years on average.

In 2002, the Northern Ireland Court of Appeal made an exception to who could avail of the right to a fair trial in R v Walsh, ruling that "if a defendant has been denied a fair trial it will almost be inevitable that the conviction will be regarded unsafe, the present case in our view constitutes an exception to the general rule. ... the conviction is to be regarded as safe, even if a breach of Article 6(1) were held to have occurred in the present case."

==== Scotland ====
The Criminal Appeal (Scotland) Act 1927 (17 & 18 Geo. 5. c. 26) increased the jurisdiction of the Scottish Court of Criminal Appeal following the miscarriage of justice surrounding the Trial of Oscar Slater. Reflecting Scotland's own legal system, which differs from that of the rest of the United Kingdom, the Scottish Criminal Cases Review Commission (SCCRC) was established in April 1999. All cases accepted by the SCCRC are subjected to a robust and thoroughly impartial review before a decision on whether or not to refer to the High Court of Justiciary is taken.

=== United States ===
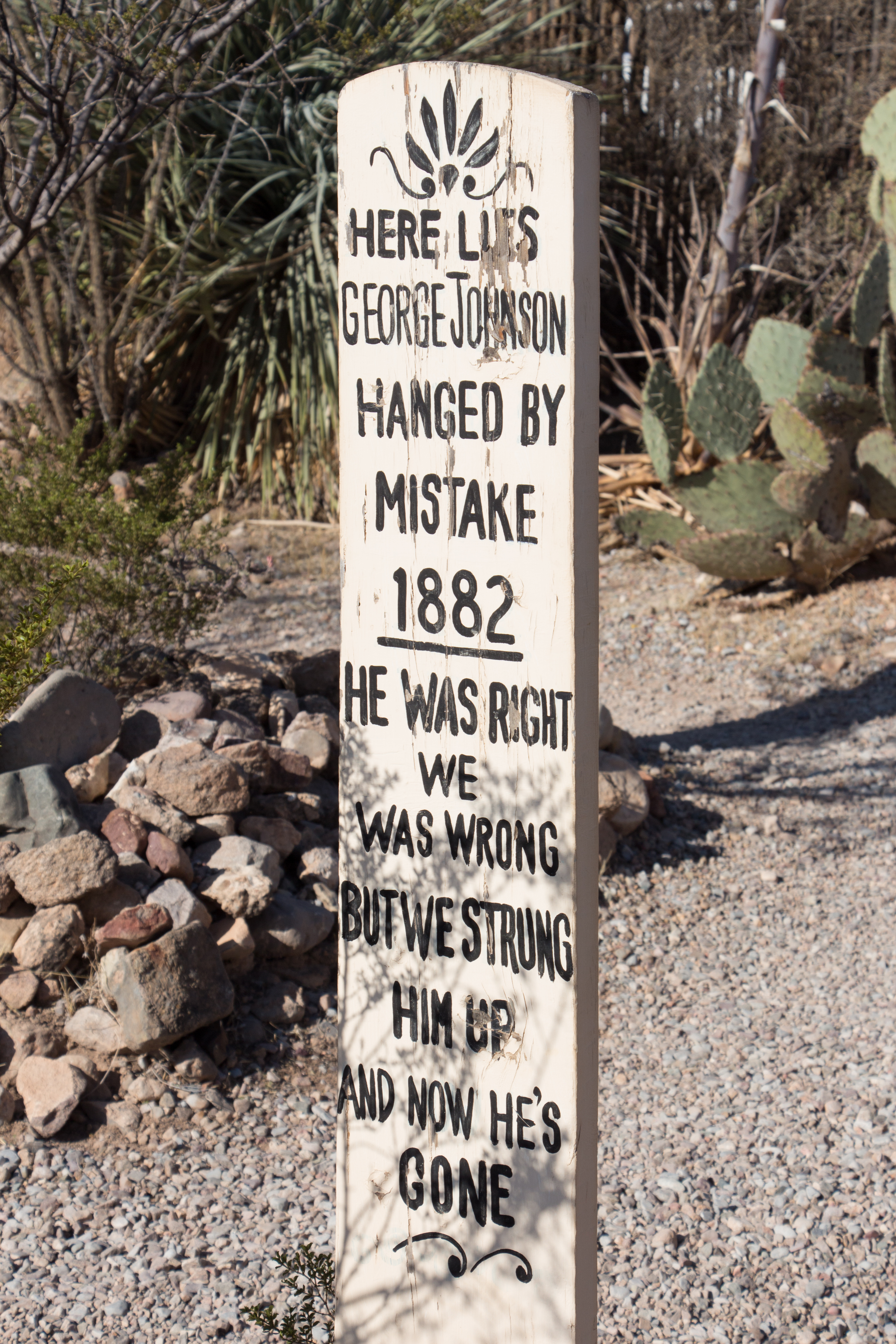
Gravestone of George Johnson who was unjustly hanged in Arizona

In June 2012, the National Registry of Exonerations, a joint project of the University of Michigan Law School and Northwestern University Pritzker School of Law, initially reported 873 individual exonerations in the U.S. from January 1989 through February 2012; the report called this number "tiny" in a country with 2.3 million people in prisons and jails, but asserted that there are far more false convictions than exonerations. By 2015, the number of individual exonerations was reported as 1,733, with 2015 having the highest annual number of exonerations since 1989. By 2019, the number had risen to 1,934 individuals. 20 individuals have been exonerated while on death row due to DNA evidence.

According to a 2020 report by the National Registry of Exonerations, official misconduct contributed to 54% of all wrong convictions. The study only counted misconduct when it directly contributed to the convictions, such as the generation of false evidence or concealment of evidence of innocence. At least 21 states in the U.S. do not offer compensation for wrongful imprisonment. The Innocence Project works, primarily through DNA testing, to exonerate people in the United States who have been wrongfully convicted of serious crimes. It has estimated that 1 percent of all U.S. prisoners are innocent. With the number of incarcerated Americans being approximately 2.4 million, by that estimate as many as 20,000 people may be incarcerated as a result of wrongful conviction.

Research into the issue of wrongful convictions have led to the use of methods to avoid wrongful convictions, such as double-blind eyewitness identification. Leading causes of wrongful convictions in the United States include snitches and unscientific forensics. Other causes include police and prosecutorial misconduct. Race and systemic racism have been found to be a factor in wrongful convictions; a report by the National Registry of Exonerations found that, as of August 2022, African Americans make up 13.6% of the U.S. population, but 53% of exonerations, and that they were seven times more likely to be falsely convicted compared to White Americans.

Leo Frank, who was kidnapped from prison by an antisemitic mob and lynched in 1915, was pardoned by the state of Georgia in 1986; Fulton County's new Conviction Integrity Unit opened a re-investigation of the case in 2019. Theater critic Jesse Green referred to 2023's Tony-winning Broadway production of "Parade" as focusing on "the marriage instead of the miscarriage of justice". In 2023, Glynn Simmons was released after 48 years of prison. His imprisonment after wrongful conviction is believed to be the longest in American history.

== See also ==
- Alford plea
- Blackstone's ratio
- Cold case
- Clearance rate
- False accusations
- False allegation of child sexual abuse
- False confession
- Innocent prisoner's dilemma
- Justice delayed is justice denied
- Legal abuse
- Penal populism
- Perverting the course of justice
- Police misconduct
- Political prisoner
- Political trial
- Presumption of guilt
- Victims' rights

=== Specific cases ===
- List of exonerated death row inmates
- List of fugitives from justice who disappeared
- List of miscarriage of justice cases
- Lists of unsolved murders
- List of wrongful convictions in the United States
