= Innocence Canada =

Canadian non-profit organization founded 1993

- Outdated logo, with tally marks equal to the number of exonerations secured (as of February 2026, logo has 34 marks)
- Formation: 1993
- Type: Legal Association
- Legal status: Active
- Purpose: Advocate, Educator and Network
- Headquarters: Toronto, Ontario
- Region served: Canada
- Official language: English; French
- Budget: $500,000 to $600,000 annually
- Website: innocencecanada.com
- Formerly called: Association in Defence of the Wrongly Convicted (AIDWYC)

Innocence Canada (formerly known as the Association in Defence of the Wrongly Convicted, or AIDWYC), is a Canadian legal non-profit organization. Founded in 1993, based in Toronto, Innocence Canada identifies, advocates for, and helps exonerate wrongly convicted individuals. The organization is also dedicated to preventing future wrongful convictions through education and criminal justice reform. As of the December 2025 exoneration of Tim Rees, who spent over two decades in prison for a crime he did not commit, Innocence Canada has helped to exonerate 36 wrongly-convicted Canadians.

== History ==
Innocence Canada was established in February 1993 as the Association in Defence of the Wrongly Convicted (AIDWYC). The organization was founded as an outgrowth of the volunteer-run Justice for Guy Paul Morin Committee, which was formed following Guy Paul Morin’s wrongful conviction a year prior. Rubin "Hurricane" Carter, an exonoree who was incarcerated for nineteen years in New Jersey following his own wrongful conviction for murder, served as AIDWYC’s founding executive director for more than a decade.

In 2009, AIDWYC received a one million dollar donation from retired Ontario Superior Court Justice Ian Cartwright, which allowed the organization to expand its operations, develop a legal education program on wrongful convictions, and take on additional cases. The Association in Defence of the Wrongly Convicted Foundation (now the Innocence Canada Foundation) was established as a registered charity and sister organization to AIDWYC in July 2010.

In October 2016, AIDWYC rebranded as Innocence Canada and adopted a new logo made up of tally marks. Each mark represents an exoneration that the organization has helped to secure.

In the same year, Innocence Canada experienced a period of financial strain as the Cartwright grant began to dry up and the organization struggled to find new sources of funding. In December 2016, however, Ontario Attorney General Yasir Naqvi announced that the Ontario government would provide $825,000 in funding to Innocence Canada over three years. The Law Society of Ontario committed to contributing $75,000 over the same time period.

Other sources of funding include grants from the Law Foundation of Ontario, as well as private donations. The organization has estimated that its lawyers donate approximately $3.5 million in pro bono hours to the organization each year.

As of the December 2025 exoneration of Tim Rees, over a decade after he completed a term of 23 years in prison for a 1989 crime he did not commit, the project has helped prove the innocence of 36 wrongly-convicted Canadians.

== Work ==
Innocence Canada accepts case review applications from individuals who have been wrongfully convicted of homicide offences. Applications are reviewed by a volunteer committee of lawyers and former judges to determine whether new and significant evidence of innocence can be identified. Where there is a reasonable likelihood that such evidence can be found, a lawyer may be assigned to conduct a full review of the case. Innocence Canada will then determine whether there is sufficient new evidence to submit an application for ministerial review on the grounds of miscarriage of justice to the Minister of Justice.

Innocence Canada has provided expert evidence to several public inquiries tasked with reviewing wrongful convictions in Canada. The organization also offers educational resources to increase public knowledge regarding the causes of wrongful convictions.

Innocence Canada is a member of the Innocence Network, an international collective of organizations dedicated to providing pro bono legal and investigative services to individuals who have been wrongly convicted and to preventing wrongful convictions.

== Notable cases ==
Some of the exoneration of 36 wrongfully convicted individuals, exonerated include David Milgaard, Guy Paul Morin and Steven Truscott.

The organization has represented several individuals whose wrongful convictions for homicide were largely the result of flawed conclusions drawn by disgraced former pediatric forensic pathologist Charles Smith. In each of these cases, the true cause of death was later determined to be either natural causes or accidental.

Innocence Canada also helped to exonerate Robert Baltovich and Anthony Hanemaayer. Both men were convicted of murders that are now believed to have been committed by notorious serial rapist and murderer Paul Bernardo.

Although not officially included among Innocence Canada’s exonorees, the organization provided legal assistance to some members of the Port Hope 8.

== Books ==
- Lowe, Mick (2013). A Conspiracy of Brothers: A True Story of Bikers, Murder and the Law. Toronto: Vintage Canada. ISBN 978-0345813169.
