= Charles Smith (pathologist) =

Canadian pathologist, performed flawed autopsies

Charles Randal Smith is a former Canadian pathologist known for performing flawed child autopsies that resulted in wrongful convictions.

As the head forensic pathologist at the Hospital for Sick Children in Toronto, Ontario, from 1982 to 2003, Smith performed more than 1,000 child autopsies. In 2002, Smith was reprimanded with a caution by the Ontario College of Physicians and Surgeons for his work on three suspicious-death cases, and in 2003 he was removed from performing autopsies.

In June 2005, the chief coroner of Ontario ordered a review of 44 autopsies carried out by Smith, thirteen of which had resulted in criminal charges and convictions. The review was released in April 2007, indicating that there were substantial problems with 20 of the autopsies.

In response to the review, Ontario Attorney General Michael Bryant immediately announced that there would be a full public inquiry into the state of pediatric forensic pathology in Ontario. The Goudge Inquiry began hearing evidence on November 12, 2007. The following year the inquiry found there to be fundamental errors made on the part of Smith. It concluded that Smith had "actively misled" superiors and made "false and misleading" statements in court. Many of the cases in which he had testified were re-examined and appealed.

Smith proclaimed that he had "a thing against people who hurt children", while critics said that "he was on a crusade and acted more like a prosecutor" than a pathologist.

== Early life and career ==
Smith was born in a Toronto Salvation Army Hospital in Toronto, Ontario, and put up for adoption three months later. He spent years looking for his biological mother and called her on her 65th birthday though she refused to take his call. His adoptive father was in the Canadian Armed Forces and lived in numerous places in Canada and Germany. Smith attended high school in Ottawa.

Smith graduated from the University of Saskatchewan in Saskatoon, Saskatchewan, Canada in 1975. He completed his training in pathology at the University of Toronto and was certified as an anatomical pathologist in 1980. He joined the Hospital for Sick Children in 1981 as one of the rotating team of pathologists, and shortly was doing autopsies on children who had met sudden or suspicious deaths.

In 1992, the Ontario Coroner's Office created a pediatric forensic pathology unit at Hospital for Sick Children and Smith was appointed director. He had become almost solely responsible for investigating suspicious child deaths in Ontario. In this period he conducted hundreds of autopsies and testified in court multiple times. He conducted training sessions for lawyers on how to examine and cross-examine expert witnesses, and training for law-enforcement and medical staff on detecting child abuse. While at Sick Children's Hospital, Smith lived on a farm in Newmarket.

== Notable cases ==
=== Maureen Laidley ===
Maureen Laidley was charged with killing Tyrell Salmon, the three-year-old son of her boyfriend, after the child died in 1998. Laidley said the boy had jumped off the couch, slipped, and struck his head on a marble coffee table, but she was arrested after Smith told police that such injuries could not result in death. The charge was abruptly stayed when outside experts testified that the injuries were fully consistent with Laidley's account.

=== William Mullins-Johnson ===
William Mullins-Johnson of Sault Ste. Marie was found guilty of the first-degree murder of his niece, Valin Johnson, after a two-and-a-half week trial in September 1994. He was convicted after a jury trial in which Smith's evidence played a major role in determining the time of death, the cause of death and whether the girl had been sexually assaulted. Mullins-Johnson had babysat Valin, 4, and her 3-year-old brother on the evening of June 26, 1993. When the girl's mother returned home, she did not check on her daughter. At 7 a.m. the next day she found Valin dead in bed.

A local pathologist performed an autopsy on Valin. Then "consultation reports" were sought from Smith and four other specialists, based on tissue samples and other evidence from the autopsy. Smith was the only consultant to conclude Valin was sexually assaulted at the time of death. That contradicted the defence's point that Valin, who had a history of vomiting in bed, might have died of natural causes. The jury convicted, which the Ontario Court of Appeal upheld in 1996. The Supreme Court of Canada dismissed a further appeal in 1998.

Attempts were made to clear his name based on available DNA technology, but the tissue could not be located by Smith, who was given the evidence by the pathologist who did the autopsy, until 2005, 11 years after the trial, when the missing tissue samples turned up in Smith's office. William Mullins-Johnson was released on bail in 2005, pending review of his case. On July 16, 2007, a report by three expert pathologists (a report written unbeknownst to the lawyers working on his behalf) determined there was no evidence that the girl was sexually assaulted, and the Ontario Attorney General Michael Bryant, said that William Mullins-Johnson's conviction "cannot stand" and that he should be acquitted by the appeals court. On October 15, 2007 he was acquitted by the Ontario Court of Appeal.

In 2010, five years after he filed a $13 million lawsuit, he received $4.25 million in a compensation settlement from the government of Ontario.

=== Sherry Sherret ===
On the morning of January 23, 1996, Sherry Sherret found her four-month-old son Joshua lying in his bed not breathing. He was rushed to the hospital where he was pronounced dead. Three and a half years later she was given the option to accept a plea of infanticide. She was convicted of infanticide without offering a defence (but offering no admission of guilt) in a plea (the delay was primarily attributable to Smith not wanting to testify). Sherret was jailed on the basis of Smith's opinion that her four-month-old son Joshua had a skull fracture, and that he had been smothered. She was released on bail in 1996 and remained on bail until the conviction. Sherret's sentence was 1 year in jail and 2 years probation. Sherret served eight months in total. Her older child was removed by Children's Aid, and in order to get him out of foster care, she agreed to give him up for adoption and have no physical contact with him until he was 18. Later exhumation of the child and examination of the skull have shown that there was no skull fracture. It is thought Dr. Smith confused the normal gap between the baby's skull plates for an injury. On December 7, 2009, the Ontario Court of Appeal exonerated Sherret, stating that it was "profoundly regrettable that due to flaws in pathological evidence" she was wrongfully convicted.

=== Brenda Waudby ===
Brenda Waudby of Peterborough was charged with beating her 2-year-old daughter Jenna to death on January 22, 1997, on the basis of Smith's professional opinion as to what time the injuries were inflicted.

=== Anthony Kporwodu and Angela Veno ===
Anthony Kporwodu and Angela Veno were charged in 1997 with murdering their infant daughter. Smith took more than seven months to prepare his initial autopsy report. The charges were ultimately thrown out by a judge for violating the constitutional right to a timely trial.

=== Louise Reynolds ===
Louise Reynolds was a 28-year-old single mother living in Kingston, Ontario, charged with second degree murder for having killed her seven-year-old daughter Sharon in 1997 by stabbing her more than 80 times with a pair of scissors. Much of the case rested on Dr. Smith's 10-page autopsy report. In January 2001 the Crown abruptly dropped the charges, after numerous experts, including Crown witnesses, disagreed with Smith and agreed that a powerful dog had mauled the girl (there was a pit bull present in the house at the time). By then, Reynolds had spent 22 months in custody.

Louise Reynolds sued in March 2007. Despite the rules related to Crown immunity, the Court of Appeal ruled, in a ground-breaking decision, that the suit against Smith and other experts could go ahead: while court testimony is protected, faulty work is not.

=== Dinesh Kumar ===
Dinesh Kumar was a 26-year-old Punjabi immigrant to Canada who was charged with second degree murder in the 1992 death of his infant son. He pled guilty to criminal negligence causing death and was sentenced to ninety days in jail. He was acquitted by the Ontario Court of Appeal on January 20, 2011. His case was part of the review ordered of Dr. Smith's cases following the Goudge Inquiry.

=== Tammy Marquardt ===
Tammy Marquardt was convicted in Ontario in 1995 of killing her two-year-old son, who had epilepsy. Her conviction rested in large part upon testimony from Smith, who concluded the boy had been strangled or smothered. She was sentenced to life in prison, and her two other children were taken from her and put up for adoption. Marquardt's conviction was set aside on 10 February 2011 by the Ontario Court of Appeal. Prosecutors agreed her trial had been faulty because of Smith's unreliable testimony, but they would not say whether a retrial would be sought or not. On June 6, murder charges were withdrawn.

=== Maria Shepherd ===
Maria Shepherd pled guilty in 1992 to the 1991 death of her stepdaughter, Kasandra Shepherd. She was sentenced to two years less a day for manslaughter. In May 2009, the Ontario Court of Appeal allowed her to appeal her initial conviction. In February 2016, the Crown agreed her guilty plea and conviction should be struck and an acquittal should be entered in its place.

== Life and career after SickKids ==
Around the time that his pathology work at Sick Children's received heavy scrutiny, Smith's marriage collapsed.

Smith resigned from Sick Children's Hospital in July 2005, to take up a position at Saskatoon City Hospital in Saskatchewan. However, he failed to mention to his new employers that he was under investigation for misconduct in Ontario; in December 2005 he was dismissed.

Smith successfully appealed, but was not reinstated because he was not licensed to practise in Saskatchewan. He pled guilty to a charge of unprofessional conduct for his failure to disclose he was under investigation by the College of Physicians and Surgeons of Saskatchewan.

On February 1, 2011, Smith was stripped of his licence during a hearing by the College of Physicians and Surgeons of Ontario examining "disgraceful conduct".

In 2017, it was reported that multiple attempts to locate and contact Smith by a CBC producer who was working on a book about Smith failed, and it was unknown where he lived at that time.

== Legacy ==
Justice Goudge's report, released on October 1, 2008 concluded that there were serious problems with the way suspicious deaths involving children are handled in Ontario. He pointed to the problems that had been found with the 20 or so problematic cases that Charles Smith had handled as evidence of serious problems in the Ontario system.

Also in 2008, the chief forensic pathologist for Ontario began a public inquiry into 220 cases of shaken baby syndrome to determine if anyone was wrongfully convicted in the babies' deaths.

Individuals that were wrongly accused by Smith were entitled up to $250,000 as a "recognition payment".

== See also ==
- List of miscarriage of justice cases
- Roy Meadow
