= False allegation of child sexual abuse =

Accusation of child molestation when it has not actually occurred

A false allegation of child sexual abuse is an accusation against one or more individuals claiming that they committed child sexual abuse when no abuse has been committed by the accused. Such accusations can be brought by the alleged victim, or by another person on the alleged victim's behalf. Studies on the rate of recorded child abuse allegations in the 1990s suggested that the overall rate of false accusations at that time was approximately 10%.

Of the allegations determined to be false, only a small portion originated with the child, the studies showed; most false allegations originated with an adult bringing the accusations on behalf of a child, and of those, a large majority occurred in the context of divorce and child-custody battles.

== Types ==
When there is insufficient supporting evidence to determine whether an accusation is true or false, it is described as "unsubstantiated" or "unfounded". Accusations that are determined to be false based on corroborating evidence can be divided into three categories:

- An allegation that is completely false in that the events that were alleged did not occur; for example, it could be done to retaliate against a teacher who denied them a grade for coursework, or an employer who withheld a pay raise or promotion. It could also be done for the purposes of extortion or blackmail.
- An allegation that describes events that did occur, but were perpetrated by an individual who is not accused, and in which the accused person is innocent. When a child makes this type of allegation, it is termed "perpetrator substitution".
- An allegation that is partially true and partially false, in that it mixes descriptions of events that actually happened with other events that did not occur.

A false allegation can occur as the result of intentional lying on the part of the accuser; or unintentionally, due to a confabulation, either arising spontaneously due to mental illness, or resulting from deliberate or accidental suggestive questioning, coaching of the child, or faulty interviewing techniques. In 1997, researchers Poole and Lindsay suggested applying separate labels to the two concepts, proposing the term "false allegations" be used specifically when the accuser is aware they are lying, and "false suspicions" for the wider range of false accusations in which suggestive questioning may have been involved.

False accusations can be prompted, aggravated, or perpetuated by law enforcement, child protection, or prosecution officials who become convinced of the guilt of the accused.

Disconfirming evidence can lead to cognitive dissonance on the part of these individuals, and lead them to deliberately or unconsciously attempt to resolve dissonance by ignoring, discounting, or even destroying the evidence. Once any steps are taken to justify the decision that the accused is guilty, it becomes very difficult for the official to accept disconfirming evidence, and this can continue during appeals, retrials, or any other effort to revisit a verdict.

=== Facilitated communication ===
Facilitated communication (FC) is a scientifically discredited technique that attempts to aid communication by people with autism or other communication disabilities who are non-verbal. The facilitator guides the disabled person's arm or hand, and attempts to help them type on a keyboard or other device. Research proves that the facilitator is the sole source of the messages obtained through FC, rather than the disabled person. However, the facilitator may believe they are not the source of the messages due to the ideomotor effect, which is the same effect that guides a Ouija board. There have been a number of accusations of sexual abuse made through facilitated communication, with many of the alleged victims being children. As of 1995, there were sixty known cases, with an unknown numbers of others settled without reaching public visibility.

== Prevalence ==
Denial of child sexual abuse by the accused, or by others, is common, and its reality is not easily accepted (though such a denial should never be interpreted as evidence of guilt). Reporting rates may also be substantially below actual rates of abuse, as many victims do not disclose their abuse, which may result in an overrepresentation of false allegations due to the inaccurate estimation of actual cases of abuse. Of the millions of reports of child sexual abuse each year to state protective agencies in the US (including both substantiated and unsubstantiated reports), there is no formal determination as to what portion of those represent false allegations.

Findings of multiple studies performed between 1987 and 1995 suggested that the rate of false allegations ranged from a low of 6% to a high of 35% of reported child sexual abuse cases. Experts have argued that the reason for the wide range of differences in the rates resulted from varying criteria used in various studies. In particular, a lower rate was found in studies that considered false allegations to be based on intentional lying, whereas the higher rates were reported in studies that also added unintentional false allegations resulting from suggestive questioning. A 1992 meta-analysis suggested that false allegations represented between 2% and 10% of all allegations.

False reports are more common in custody disputes. Children appear to rarely make up false allegations of their own accord, but will make false allegations if coercively questioned by individuals who believe abuse has occurred, but refuse to accept children's statements that they were not abused (as was common practice during the satanic ritual abuse moral panic). False allegations can also arise as a consequence of false memories, sometimes implanted by questionable therapeutic practices.

=== False retractions ===
False retractions of accusations by children who have been abused are suggested to occur for one or more of several reasons, such as out of shame or embarrassment, due to fear of being sent to a foster home, or of the reaction of adults leading them to feel their behavior was "wrong" or "bad", due to a desire to protect the perpetrator (who may be a close family member), out of fear of destroying the family, due to coaching by an adult family member insisting that the child withdraw the accusation, and others. False retractions are less common when the child receives timely and appropriate support following the statement of the allegation.

== Effect of changes to legal tests (UK) ==
In 2000, according to support group Falsely Accused Carers and Teachers (FACT), there was a 90% conviction rate for alleged child sex abusers, as compared to just 9% for cases of adult rape. In the UK, all the post-1970 court cases that are recognized as authorities on evidence of disposition "concern charges of sexual abuse of minors." In 1991, the House of Lords judgment in Director of Public Prosecutions versus P (D.P.P v P [1991] 2 A.C. 447) significantly lowered the barrier to admission of similar fact evidence of disposition to commit a crime.

This, combined with the police practice of "trawling" for child abuse victims using door-to-door interviews and the potential for monetary compensation, has created opportunities and incentive for false allegations to occur:

Normally, an allegation of a criminal offense has to stand or fall on its own merits; if a witness accusing someone of sexual abuse was sufficiently credible, or could adduce supporting evidence, then an abuser would be convicted. Until 1991, multiple allegations against the same person could only be held to be mutually corroborating if there were "striking similarities" between the alleged crimes, indicating a criminal's "signature", a distinct modus operandi. But the judgment removed this protection. In effect, the courts have accepted the idea of "corroboration by volume".

In 2002, the Home Affairs Select Committee (Fourth report, 2001/2), which dealt with police trawling practices and referred to the "enormous difficulties" faced by those accused of child sexual abuse, recommended that the requirement for similar fact evidence to be linked by "striking similarities" be restored in cases involving allegations of historical child abuse. However, this recommendation contradicted the Government White Paper Justice for All (2002), which proposed lowering the threshold for the admission of similar fact evidence still further.

== Effect on the child and the accused ==
Allegations of sexual abuse can be inherently traumatic to the child when false. People falsely charged with sexual abuse often face numerous problems of their own. The nature of the crime leveled at them often evokes an overwhelming sense of betrayal. In highly publicized cases, the general public has a strong tendency to summarily assume the accused is guilty, leading to very serious social stigma. The accused, even if acquitted, risks being fired from their job, losing their friends and other relationships, having their property vandalized or even confiscated (via civil forfeiture), and being harassed by those believing them to be guilty despite no evidence proving their guilt.

== Support groups ==
In 2001, there were 18 support and lobby groups extant in the UK "set up to redress the injustice suffered by those who, they claim, have been wrongly convicted in abuse cases." Groups currently active in the UK include: False Allegations Against Carers and Teachers (FACT), False Allegations Support Organization (FASO), People Against False Allegations of Abuse (PAFAA with SOFAP), and SAFARI.

== Media ==
- Take Me to the River (2015)―An American drama film about a teenager who plans to come out to his family at a reunion, but runs into trouble when he is falsely accused of sexually abusing his younger female cousin.
- The Hunt (Danish: Jagten)―A 2012 Danish drama film by Thomas Vinterberg about a man (Mads Mikkelsen) who becomes the target of mass hysteria after being wrongly accused of sexually assaulting a child.
- Capturing the Friedmans (Dir. Andrew Jarecki)―A 2003 HBO documentary about Arnold and Jesse Friedman, who both pleaded guilty to child abuse, but claimed the charges were false and the guilty pleas coerced.
- A Map of the World (1994)―A novel that was turned into a film (1999) about a school nurse falsely accused of molesting a student.
- Serious Charge (1959)―A film starring Anthony Quayle as an English vicar who was falsely accused of sexually assaulting a teenage boy. The youth's story is supported by a woman whose affections the vicar had spurned.

== See also ==
- Child sexual abuse accommodation syndrome
- Cleveland child abuse scandal
- Day-care sex-abuse hysteria
- False accusations
  - False accusation of rape
- Kern County child abuse cases
- McMartin preschool trial
- Operation Midland
- Orkney child abuse scandal
- Outreau trial
- Think of the children
- Thurston County ritual abuse case
- Treva Throneberry
- Wee Care Nursery School abuse trial
- Peter Ellis
