= Val Sim =

New Zealand lawyer

Valery Catherine Sim (born 1954) is a former New Zealand Law Commissioner and former member of the New Zealand Criminal Justice Advisory Board.

She attended Victoria University of Wellington where she graduated with an LL.B (Hons). After spending 15 years as a barrister or solicitor, she joined the Ministry of Justice in 1992. In 1998, she was appointed to the position of Chief Legal Counsel. During her six years in that position, she ruled on many petitions for the exercise of the Royal Prerogative of Mercy. Among the petitioners who she said should not be pardoned were David Bain, Rex Haig, and Peter Ellis. The Privy Council later quashed Bain's conviction, while Haig's was overturned by the Court of Appeal. In October 2022 the Supreme Court of New Zealand quashed all convictions entered against Peter Ellis, who had died three years earlier in September, 2019.

In 2002, following the publication of Lynley Hood's book, A City Possessed, about the Peter Ellis case, then Justice Minister Phil Goff asked Sim to review Hood's book to determine if it contained any new evidence. Sim said it did not. She concluded her review by quoting Sir Thomas Eichelbaum, who in 2001 reported that the case should be “allowed to rest”. Sim was heavily involved in Eichelbaum's inquiry into the case. Her involvement has raised a number of questions about her impartiality, questions which she has refused to answer.

In 2004, Sim was appointed as Human Rights leader at Crown Law Office. In 2007, she was made a Law Commissioner for a term of three years. The following year she was appointed to the Criminal Justice Advisory Board, which was established to improve public confidence in the criminal justice system. The Board was short-lived.
