= The Outreau Case: A French Nightmare =

- Genre: Documentary
- Country of origin: France
- Original language: French
- No. of episodes: 4

Production
- Running time: 44–48 min

Original release
- Network: Netflix
- Release: March 15, 2024

The Outreau Case: A French Nightmare is a Netflix original documentary series on the Outreau case, a criminal case of pedophilia which took place between 1997 and 2000 in Outreau in northern France. The series features the child abuse allegations that led to a judicial disaster, revisiting the complex and controversial Outreau case.

== Synopsis ==
The series provides an in-depth examination of the Outreau trial, a case that began in the early 2000s in the small town of Outreau, northern France. The case involved allegations of child abuse against several individuals, leading to a series of trials that resulted in wrongful convictions, widespread media attention, and public outrage. Through interviews, archival footage, and expert analysis, the documentary sheds light on the errors and misjudgments that plagued the investigation and trials, highlighting the profound impact on the lives of the accused and the French judicial system.

== Cast ==
- Jonathan Delay - Himself
- Hubert Delarue - Himself; Lawyer of Alain Marècaux
- Fabrice Burgaud - Himself; Examining magistrate
- Fabienne Roy-Nansion - Herself; Lawyer of David Delplanque
- Frank Berton - Himself; Lawyer
- Pascale Fontaine - Herself; Magistrate
- Claire Montpied - Herself; Magistrate
- Odile Polvèche - Herself; Former wife of Alain Marècaux
- Éric Dupond-Moretti - Himself; Roselyne Godard's lawyer
- Marie-Christine Gryson - Herself; Psychology expert
- Stèphane Chochois - Himself; Forensic pathologist
- Philippe Lescène - Himself; Sandrine Lavier's Lawyer, featured in 1 episode, 2024
- Pascale Pouille-Deldicque - Herself; Myriam Badaoui's Attorney, featured in 1 episode, 2024
- Olivier Rangeon - Himself; Daniel Legrand Jr's lawyer

== Reception ==
The Outreau Case: A French Nightmare received positive reviews for its portrayal of the French judicial system and the intricacies and emotional layers of the Outreau trial. It also received praise for its handling of sensitive topics, offering a balanced perspective through interviews with involved parties, including legal experts and journalists. The series examines the judicial missteps and their profound implications Outreau trial's fallout.

== See also ==
- False accusation of child sexual abuse
- Judicial reform in France
- Miscarriage of justice
- Child protection
- Legal ethics
