= Day-care sex-abuse hysteria =

Moral panic and series of prosecutions

Day-care sex-abuse hysteria was a moral panic that occurred primarily during the 1980s and early 1990s, and featured charges against day-care providers accused of committing several forms of child abuse, including Satanic ritual abuse. The collective cases are often considered a part of the Satanic panic. A 1982 case in Kern County, California, United States, first publicized the issue of day-care sexual abuse, and the issue figured prominently in news coverage for almost a decade. The Kern County case was followed by cases elsewhere in the United States, as well as Canada, New Zealand, Brazil, and various European countries.

== Causes ==
=== Anxiety ===
During the late 1970s and early 1980s, many more mothers were working outside of the home, resulting in the opening of large numbers of day-care facilities. Anxiety and guilt due to leaving young children with strangers may have created a climate of fear and readiness to believe false accusations.

=== Suggestibility of children ===
Children are vulnerable to outside influences that can result in fabrication of testimony. Their testimony can be influenced in a variety of ways. In an article published by the American Psychological Association and titled Jeopardy in the Courtroom: A Scientific Analysis of Children’s Testimony, by Maggie Bruck—a professor within the Division of Child and Adolescent Psychiatry at Johns Hopkins School of Medicine—wrote that children incorporate aspects of the interviewer's questions into their answers, as an attempt to tell the interviewer what the child believes is being sought. Studies also show that when adults ask children questions that do not make sense (such as: "is milk bigger than water?" or "is red heavier than yellow?"), most children will offer an answer, believing that there is an answer to be given, rather than understanding the absurdity of the question. Furthermore, repeated questioning of children causes them to change their answers. This is because the children perceive the repeated questioning as a sign that they did not give the "correct" answer previously. Children are also especially susceptible to leading and suggestive questions. Research has found that, in the absence of being prompted, it is uncommon for children to make fictitious reports of sexual abuse.

Interviewer bias also influences child testimony. When an interviewer has a preconceived notion as to the truth of the matter being investigated, the questioning is performed so as to extract statements that evidence these beliefs. As a result, evidence that could disprove the belief is never sought by the interviewer. Additionally, positive reinforcement by the interviewer can taint child testimony. Often, such reinforcement is given to encourage a spirit of cooperation by the child, but impartiality can quickly end as the interviewer nods, smiles, or offers verbal encouragement to "helpful" statements. Some studies show that when interviewers make reassuring statements to child witnesses, the children are more likely to fabricate stories of past events that never occurred.

Peer pressure also influences children to fabricate stories. Studies show that when a child witness is told that his or her friends have already testified that certain events occurred, the child witness is more likely to create a matching story. The status of the interviewer can also influence a child's testimony, because the more authority an interviewer has, such as a police officer, the more likely a child is to comply with that person's apparent agenda.

Finally, while there are endorsers of the use of anatomically correct dolls in questioning victims of sexual abuse/molestation, there are also critics of this practice. These critics say that because of the novelty of the dolls, children will act out sexually explicit acts with the dolls even if the child has not been sexually abused. Another criticism is that, due to conflicting claims about how children tend to play with these dolls (some studies suggest that children who have been sexually abused play with them in a more sexually explicit manner, while other studies have found no correlation), no meaningful conclusions can be drawn from how a particular child plays.

== Timeline ==
- 1982 – Kern County child abuse cases.
- 1983 – McMartin preschool trial in California.
- 1984 – Fells Acres Day School in Massachusetts.
- 1984 – Bernard F. Baran Jr. convicted in 1985, exonerated 2009.
- 1984 – Georgian Hills Daycare Center, Memphis, Tennessee
- 1985 – Bronx Five case.
- 1985 – Wee Care Nursery School in New Jersey in April.
- 1986 – Child Development Center, Presidio of San Francisco in San Francisco.
- 1987 – Cleveland child abuse scandal in England.
- 1987 – Friedman cases begin.
- 1987 – The Army announces it will be closing and demolishing the Presidio Child Development Center.
- 1987 – Baptist minister and Presidio teacher, Gary Hambright, is charged with sexually abusing 10 boys and girls. Hambright was charged with molesting only 10 children because other victims were so young they would not be allowed to testify in court, according to an assistant United States attorney, Peter Robinson. At least 4 children were found to have Chlamydia during physical examinations.
- 1988 – Remaining charges against Gary Hambright are dropped at the request of parents and prosecutors. San Francisco prosecutors decline to bring charges against Lt. Col. Michael Aquino, founder of the Temple of Set, who was involved in the Presidio investigation.
- 1989 – Glendale Montessori sexual abuse case in Stuart, Florida.
- 1989 – Little Rascals Day Care Center scandal in Edenton, North Carolina.
- 1989 – Gary Hambright dies of AIDS on November 8. The previous year, Army officials recommended the children get tested due to a "rumor" circulating about Hambright having AIDS. Due to confidentiality laws, the results of those tests are unknown.
- 1990 – Acquittals in McMartin preschool trial; remaining charges dropped.
- 1991 – Dan and Fran Keller, Fran's Daycare Center, Oak Hill, Texas.
- 1991 – Christchurch Civic Creche, New Zealand, involving Peter Hugh McGregor Ellis.
- 1992 – Kaare Sortland is killed, in Tacoma, Washington, after being found not guilty of child abuse.
- 1992 – Martensville Scandal, Martensville, Saskatchewan, Canada.
- 1994 – Wenatchee child abuse prosecutions
- 1996 – Convictions in the Kern county child abuse case overturned.
- 1997 – "Day of Contrition" in Salem, Massachusetts
- 2013 – Dan and Fran Keller released from prison, four years before being ruled innocent of the charges against them.

== Significant cases ==
Nearly all of those accused in these cases were eventually freed, but no U.S. Governor has pardoned a prisoner convicted falsely as a result of the hysteria. On January 14, 1997, many of those freed attended a "Day of Contrition" conference in Salem, Massachusetts.

=== McMartin Preschool ===
The McMartin Preschool case was the first daycare abuse case to receive major media attention in the United States. The case concerned the McMartin Preschool in Manhattan Beach, California, where seven teachers were accused of kidnapping children, flying them in an airplane to another location, and forcing them to engage in group sex, as well as forcing them to watch animals being tortured and killed. The case also involved accusations that children had been forced to participate in bizarre religious rituals, and being used to make child pornography. The case began with a single accusation, made by a mother—who was later found to be a paranoid schizophrenic—of one of the students, but grew rapidly when investigators informed parents of the accusation, and began interviewing other students. The case made headlines nationally during 1984, and seven teachers were arrested and charged that year. However, when a new district attorney took over the case in 1986, his office re-examined the evidence, and dismissed charges against all but two of the original defendants. Their trials became one of the longest and most expensive criminal trials in the history of the United States, but in 1990, all of these charges were also dismissed. The trial was met with disapproval by both its jurors and academic researchers, who criticized the interviewing techniques that investigators had used in their investigations of the school, alleging that interviewers had "coaxed" children into making unfounded accusations, repeatedly asking children the same questions, and offering various incentives until the children reported having been abused. Most scholars now agree that the accusations these interviews elicited from children were false. Sociologist Mary de Young and historian Philip Jenkins have both cited the McMartin case as the prototype for a wave of similar accusations and investigations between 1983 and 1995, which constituted a moral panic.

=== Country Walk ===
Frank and Ileana Fuster owned the Country Walk Babysitting Service in the Country Walk suburb of Miami, Florida, United States. In 1985, Frank was found guilty of 14 counts of abuse. He was sentenced to prison with a minimum length of 165 years. Fuster's alleged victims testified that he led them in Satanic rituals, and terrorized them by forcing them to watch him mutilate birds—a lesson to children who might reveal the abuse. Fuster had been previously convicted for manslaughter and molesting a 9-year-old child. Testimony from children in the case was elicited by University of Miami child psychologists Laurie and Joseph Braga, who resorted to coercive questioning of the alleged victims when the desired answers were not forthcoming. Fuster's wife, Ileana, recanted her court testimony in an interview with the television program Frontline, saying that she had been kept naked in solitary confinement, and subjected to other forms of physical and psychological duress until she had agreed to testify against her husband.

The case was prosecuted by Dade County state's attorney Janet Reno, who also prosecuted day-care sex-abuse cases against Grant Snowden and Bobby Fijnje. Ileana said that Reno visited her in jail and pressured her to confess. The incident also inspired a 1986 book and a 1990 made-for-television movie named Unspeakable Acts. Fuster continues to serve a 165-year prison sentence, making him the last person imprisoned by the hysteria.

=== Fells Acres Day School ===
During April 1984, Gerald Amirault was arrested and charged with abusing children in his care at the Fells Acres Day School in Malden, Massachusetts, United States. After Amirault changed the pants on a young boy who had wet himself, the boy's mother, uncle, and therapist questioned him over a period of months, until the boy alleged that Amirault had been sexually abusing him. The boy's mother then telephoned a child abuse hotline to report that her son had been abused sexually, and Amirault was arrested soon thereafter. As a result of the 1986 trial, Amirault was convicted of assaulting and raping nine children, and sentenced to 30 to 40 years in state prison. In a separate trial, his mother, Violet Amirault, and sister, Cheryl Amirault LeFave, were also convicted of similar charges, and sentenced to jail for 8 to 20 years. According to Richard Beck, the case developed "in the usual way" compared to other moral panic cases, with more and more children making increasingly bizarre allegations against the accused during the course of the investigation. The allegations included reports of "bad clowns," robots, "magic rooms," and animals being tortured. According to Beck, one of the prosecutors responsible for the case commented that coaxing allegations out of the children had been like “getting blood from a stone.”

During 1995, The Wall Street Journal journalist Dorothy Rabinowitz questioned testimony from the children that had been elicited with dubious interrogation techniques, and wrote: "no sane person reading the transcripts of these interrogations can doubt the wholesale fabrications of evidence on which this case was built." Rabinowitz was a finalist in 1996, and winner in 2001, of the Pulitzer Prize for Commentary for her newspaper columns on the issue, and made the Amiraults’ case a centerpiece of her book No Crueler Tyrannies: Accusation, False Witness, and Other Terrors of Our Times. Violet and Cheryl were granted a new trial in 1997, on the basis that they had been denied the right to face their accusers and had been represented inadequately at trial, but Violet died, and a judge reduced Cheryl's sentence to time served before the new trial could proceed. During 2001, the Massachusetts Board of Pardons recommended that Gerald's sentence be commuted, citing "substantial doubt" about his guilt. He was granted parole in 2003. Writing about the case at the time of Gerald's release, the magazine The Economist suggested in an editorial that while the Amiraults had long maintained their innocence, and had attracted a "string of prominent supporters" who believed that they had been convicted wrongly, "many others continue to believe that Mr. Amirault committed the crimes."

=== Bernard Baran ===
On October 4, 1984, a drug addicted couple acting as police informants telephoned their contact within the police department of Pittsfield, Massachusetts, United States and accused Bernard Baran of molesting their son. The child had been attending the government operated Early Childhood Development Center (ECDC) where Baran, an openly homosexual 19-year-old, worked as a teacher's aide. The accusers had complained previously to the board of directors that they "didn't want no homo" around their son.

Within days of the first allegation, ECDC hosted a puppet show, and delivered letters to parents notifying them about a child at the day care who had gonorrhea. Five other allegations were made. Baran was tried in the Berkshire County courthouse 105 days after the first allegation, a swiftness noted in the later court rulings. The courtroom was closed during the children's testimony, which Baran claimed violated his right to a public trial. Baran's defense attorney was later ruled ineffective. Baran was convicted on January 30, 1985, of three counts of rape of a child, and five counts of indecent assault and battery. He was sentenced to three life terms, plus 8 to 20 years on each charge. Baran maintained his innocence throughout his case. In 1999, a new legal team accepted his case. In 2004, hearings began in a motion for a new trial. In 2006, Baran was granted a new trial, and released on $50,000 bail. In May 2009, the Massachusetts Appeals Court affirmed the new trial ruling, setting aside the 1985 convictions. The Berkshire County District Attorney's office dismissed the original charges, and Baran's record was cleared.

=== The Bronx Five ===
Prosecutor Mario Merola brought prosecutions resulting in the conviction of five men, including Nathaniel Grady, a 47-year-old Methodist minister, of sexually abusing children in day care facilities throughout the Bronx. Grady spent ten years in prison before being released in 1996.

Three employees of another Bronx day-care center were arrested in August 1984, on the charges of abusing at least ten children in their care. Federal and city investigators then questioned dozens of children at the day care. They were reported as having used 'dolls, gentle words, and a quiet approach'. More children reported being abused sexually, increasing the total to 30. Three more day care facilities also were investigated for sexual abuse. On August 11, 1984, federal funds were ended to the Head Start preschool program at the Praca Day Care Center, and three employees had been arrested. In June 1985, the day care facility was reopened with new sponsorship.

In January 1986, Albert Algerin, employed at the Praca Day Care center, was sentenced to 50 years for rape and sexual abuse. In May, Praca employee Jesus Torres, a former teacher's aide was sentenced to 40 years. Praca employee Franklin Beauchamp had his case overturned by the New York Court of Appeals during May 1989.

All five convictions were ultimately reversed.

=== Wee Care Nursery School ===
In Maplewood, New Jersey, during April 1985, Margaret Kelly Michaels was indicted for 299 offenses in connection with the sexual assault of 33 children. Michaels denied the charges. "The prosecution produced expert witnesses who said that almost all the children displayed symptoms of sexual abuse." Prosecution witnesses testified that the children "had regressed into such behavior as bed-wetting and defecating in their clothing. The witnesses said the children became afraid to be left alone or to stay in the dark." Some of the other teachers testified against her. "The defense argued that Michaels did not have the time or opportunity to go to a location where all the activities could have taken place without someone seeing her."

Michaels was sentenced to 47 years in the "sex case". Michaels "told the judge that she was confident her conviction would be overturned on appeal". After five years in prison, her appeal was successful, and her sentence was reversed by a New Jersey appeals court. The New Jersey Supreme Court upheld the appellate court's decision, and declared, "the interviews of the children were highly improper and utilized coercive and unduly suggestive methods". A three judge panel ruled she had been denied a fair trial, because, "the prosecution of the case had relied on testimony that should have been excluded because it improperly used an expert's theory, called the child sexual abuse accommodation syndrome, to establish guilt". The original judge was also criticized "for the way in which he allowed the children to give televised testimony from his chambers".

=== Glendale Montessori ===
James Toward and Brenda Williams were accused of kidnapping and sexually abusing six boys who attended Glendale Montessori School in Stuart, Florida, as preschoolers during 1986 and 1987. Investigators claimed to know as many as 60 victims, mostly from the ages 2 to 5.

In 1988, Williams, an office manager, was convicted and sentenced to 10 years in prison. She pleaded no contest to sexual abuse and attempted kidnapping charges involving five boys, and she was released from prison in 1993 after serving five years. In 1989, Toward, the owner of Glendale Montessori School, pleaded guilty to child sexual abuse charges and received a 27-year sentence. While technically maintaining his innocence, he allowed a guilty plea to be entered against him, convicting him of molesting or kidnapping six boys. Toward was placed in involuntary commitment due to the Jimmy Ryce Act. Although he maintained his innocence, Toward said he plea-bargained to avoid an almost certain life sentence.

=== Little Rascals ===
In Edenton, North Carolina, in January 1989, a parent accused Bob Kelly of sexual abuse. During the next several months, investigations and therapy resulted in allegations against dozens of other adults in the town, culminating in the arrest of seven adults.

Despite the severity of some of the alleged acts, parents noticed no abnormal behaviour in their children until after initial accusations were made. Bob Kelly's trial lasted eight months, and on April 22, 1992, he was convicted of 99 out of 100 counts against him. In 1995, the North Carolina Court of Appeals granted new trials to two defendants, including Kelly. Charges were ultimately dismissed for both.

The remainder of the defendants received a variety of sentences.

=== Dale Akiki ===
Dale Akiki, a developmentally-delayed man with Noonan syndrome, was accused of satanic ritual abuse during 1991. Akiki and his wife were volunteer babysitters at Faith Chapel in Spring Valley, California. The accusations started when a young girl told her mother that "[Akiki] showed me his penis," after which the mother contacted the police. After interviews, nine other children accused Akiki of killing animals, such as a giraffe and an elephant, and drinking their blood in front of the children. He was found not guilty of the 35 counts of child abuse and kidnapping in his 1993 trial.

In 1994, the San Diego County Grand Jury reviewed the Akiki cases, and concluded there was no reason to pursue the theory of ritual abuse. On August 25, 1994, he filed a suit against the County of San Diego, Faith Chapel Church, and many others, which was settled for $2 million. Akiki's public defenders received the Public Defender of the Year award for their work defending Akiki.

=== Oak Hill satanic ritual abuse trial ===
Frances Keller and her husband, Dan Keller, both of Austin, Texas, were convicted of sexually abusing a 3-year-old girl in their care, and sentenced to 48 years in prison. They spent 21 years in prison until their release in 2013.

The case began on August 15, 1991, when a 3-year-old girl told her mother that Dan Keller had spanked her. However, the “allegation quickly morphed into an allegation of sexual abuse.” The mother and daughter were on their way to a scheduled appointment with the girl's therapist, Donna David-Campbell, who elicited details that included Keller defecating on her head and sexually assaulting her with a pen. During the time leading up to the trial, two other children from the day care offered similar accusations. According to the children, the couple served blood-laced Kool-Aid, and forced them to have videotaped sex with adults and other children. The Kellers, they said, sometimes wore white robes and lit candles before hurting them. The children also accused the Kellers of forcing them to watch or participate with the killing and dismembering of cats, dogs, and a crying baby. Bodies were unearthed in cemeteries, and new holes were dug to hide freshly killed animals. At one point, an adult passer-by was shot and dismembered with a chainsaw. The children recalled several airplane flights, including one to Mexico, where they were sexually abused by soldiers, before returning to Austin in time to meet their parents at the day care.

The only physical evidence of abuse in the case was presented by Michael Mouw, a then-novice emergency room physician at Brackenridge Hospital, who examined the 3-year-old girl in 1991, on the night she first accused Dan Keller of abuse. Mouw testified at the Kellers' trial that he found “deformities—described as possible lacerations to the hymen and a tear of the fourchette,” and constituted what he considered possible “signs of sexual abuse.” Mouw's determination was confirmed by pediatrician Beth Nauert, who agreed at the time that the child had “deformities to her vaginal area that could be signs of sexual abuse.” However, Nauert would notably examine the child two weeks after Mouw, and “found no signs of any deformities.” Three years after the 1992 trial, Mouw attended a medical seminar hosted by Nauert that “detailed normal variations of female genitalia” in a slide presentation. Mouw stated that the presentation included a photo that was identical to what he had observed in the girl. In 2009, Mouw issued a reversal on his prior claims, after being contacted by The Austin Chronicle, as a part of their story titled “Believing the Children” that covered the Kellers' case. Mouw stated that his erroneous medical testimony was caused by his “little experience, if any formal education at all, in conducting sexual abuse examinations of children.”

On November 26, 2013, the Travis County district attorney's office announced that Fran Keller, now age 63, was being released on bond and her husband, Dan Keller, who was convicted at the same time, would be released within a week as a result of a deal with their lawyers. "There is a reasonable likelihood that (the medical expert's) false testimony affected the judgment of the jury and violated Frances Keller's right to a fair trial," said the district attorney.

On June 20, 2017, the Travis County district attorney's office announced that the case against the Kellers had been dismissed, citing actual innocence. They were awarded $3.4 million in compensation from the state of Texas for the 21 years they spent in prison.

=== Wenatchee child abuse prosecutions ===
In Wenatchee, Washington, during 1994 and 1995, police and state social workers performed what was then termed the nation's most extensive child sex-abuse investigation. Forty-three adults were arrested on 29,726 charges of child sex abuse involving 60 children. Parents, Sunday school teachers, and a pastor were charged, and many were convicted of abusing their own children or the children of others in the community. However, prosecutors were unable to provide any physical evidence of the charges. The main witness was the 13-year-old foster daughter of police officer Robert Perez, who had investigated the cases. A jury found the city of Wenatchee and Douglas County, Washington, negligent in the 1994–1995 investigations. In 2001, $3 million was awarded to a couple who had been accused wrongly as a result of the inquiry.

=== Christchurch Civic Crèche ===
Peter Ellis, a child-care worker at the Christchurch Civic Crèche in New Zealand, was found guilty of 16 counts of sexual abuse against children in 1992, and served seven years in jail. Four female co-workers were also arrested on 15 charges of abuse, but were released after these charges were dismissed. Ellis was accused, among other things, of suspending children in cages, taking them through tunnels, ceilings and trapdoors, forcing them into a hot oven, burying them in coffins; and one boy claimed he had his belly-button removed with pliers. One parent alleged a boy called Andrew had been sacrificed. No child was actually reported missing by anyone involved.

Peter Ellis consistently denied any abuse, and although he died in September 2019, on 7 October 2022 New Zealand's Supreme Court unanimously quashed Mr Ellis' convictions. The Court found major problems in the evidence of the prosecution's expert witness, ruling that it departed from appropriate standards and "lacked balance, suffered from problematic circular reasoning and had the overall effect of suggesting to the jury that “clusters” of behavior support a finding of sexual abuse...", and that although the risk of the complainants' evidence being contaminated was traversed at the 1993 trial, the jury was not fairly informed of the level of risk.

=== Martensville satanic sex scandal ===
In 1992 a mother in the central Saskatchewan city of Martensville alleged that a local woman who had a babysitting service and day care facility in her home had sexually abused her child. Police began an investigation, resulting in a sudden increase of allegations. More than a dozen persons, including five police officers from two different forces, were ultimately charged with more than 100 charges associated with participating with a Satanic cult named The Brotherhood of The Ram, which allegedly practiced ritualized sexual abuse of numerous children at a "Devil Church".

The son of the day-care owner was tried and found guilty, then a Royal Canadian Mounted Police task force assumed control of the investigation. It concluded the original investigation was motivated by "emotional hysteria". During 2003, defendants sued for wrongful prosecution. In 2004, Richard and Kari Klassen received $100,000 each, out of the $1.5 million compensation awarded for the malicious prosecution.

== See also ==
- Child sexual abuse accommodation syndrome
- False allegation of child sexual abuse
- False memories
- The Hunt (2012)
- Moral panic
- Pizzagate conspiracy theory
- Repressed memory
- Salem witch trials
- Witch hunt
- Outreau trial
- Hampstead Hoax

=== Documentaries ===
- Capturing the Friedmans, controversial 2003 documentary
- Freeing Bernie Baran, 2010 documentary on one of the earliest cases
- Indictment: The McMartin Trial, 1995 HBO docudrama
- Witch Hunt, 2008 documentary produced and narrated by Sean Penn, about the Kern County child abuse cases

== Sources ==
- Ceci, SJ; Bruck M (1996). Jeopardy in the courtroom. American Psychological Association. ISBN 978-1-55798-282-7.
- Francis, Ross (November 2007a). "New evidence in the Peter Ellis case" (PDF). New Zealand Law Journal: 399–404. Archived from the original (PDF) on 30 May 2008.
- McLoughlin, David (August 1996). "Second Thoughts on the Christchurch Civic Creche case: Has justice failed Peter Ellis?". North & South. pp. 54–69. Archived from the original on 6 August 2019.
