= Whithair v A-G =

- Court: High Court of New Zealand
- Full case name: Whithair v A-G
- Decided: 12 March 1996
- Citation: [1996] 2 NZLR 45

Court membership
- Judge sitting: Eichelbaum CJ

Keywords
- negligence

Whithair v A-G [1996] 2 NZLR 45 is a cited case in New Zealand regarding the Bill of Rights Act.
