= Kelly Michaels =

Kelly Michaels might refer to:

- Ruth Copeland (born 1946), also known as Kelly Michaels, English-American singer
- Margaret Kelly Michaels, defendant in the Wee Care Nursery School abuse trial
