= Hampstead hoax =

2014 false accusations of paedophilia

The Hampstead hoax was a series of false allegations starting in 2014 that a Satan-worshipping paedophile ring of about "175 parents, teachers, and religious leaders" had been abusing children in the Hampstead area of north London. Police found no evidence of paedophilia, abuse, murder, or Satanism. The alleged abusers were nevertheless subjected to harassment, death threats, and online abuse that continued until at least 2022. It later emerged that the two children who had made the initial allegations had been threatened by adults into making them.

== The hoax ==
In the summer of 2014, two children made accusations that their father, Ricky Dearman, former husband of Russian-born Hampstead resident Ella Draper, was running a paedophile ring. Draper reported that her two children had been abused by their father. In a police interview the children said that their father was a member of a ring of Satanic paedophiles who killed babies and drank their blood. They said that cult members would drink the babies' blood, then dance around wearing babies' skulls, and shoes made of baby skin. The children said that, in addition to their father, their elder half-brother, several teachers from their school, the priest at the adjacent church, many parents from their school, social workers, Children and Family Court Advisory and Support Service employees, and police officers all belonged to the Satanic cult.

== Response ==
A police search of the Christchurch Primary School and the church found that the secret rooms where the children said babies were killed did not exist. None of the other children whom the two children had named as abuse victims made similar accusations. Some of the sites given by the children as locations of abuse did not exist, and none of the Metropolitan Police officers whom the children had named as members of the cult were found to exist.

The children recanted and told police that they had been forced to make the allegations by their mother and her partner, Abraham Christie, in a process that a judge would later refer to as 'torture'. According to Judge Justice Pauffley:

There is every reason to conclude that over the course of the four weeks spent abroad last summer, the children's minds were filled with ever more elaborate, fantastical and sexually explicit stories. … It was part of a deliberate plan by Mr Christie and Ms Draper.

Police were unable to prosecute Christie and Draper for the psychological abuse as it had happened while they were on holiday in Morocco, and was therefore outside of their jurisdiction.

Draper continued to sue her ex-husband for custody of the children and recruited Sabine McNeill to help her. In a podcast about the hoax, Alexi Mostrous describes McNeill as a 76-year-old German former scientist who had moved to Britain and, having convinced herself that the family courts were not acting in the best interests of parents, became a McKenzie friend, advising people without lawyers representing themselves in court.

In early 2015, McNeill took videos of police interviews of the children describing the satanic ritual abuse, a list of the alleged abusers' names, and other confidential information from Draper's case, and posted it all on the internet, specifically on Henry Curteis's The Tap Blog. The videos went viral. The conspiracy theory spread that there was a satanic paedophile ring in Hampstead, causing Dearman and the other 175 people to be subjected to harassment, death threats and online abuse that continued until at least 2022. After a court ordered that both Draper and McNeill remove material about the case from the internet, Draper evaded police and fled to Spain, McNeill fled to Germany, but was arrested on her return to London.

In 2016, McNeill was issued with a lifetime restraining order against broadcasting illegal and false claims. Three months later, she pleaded guilty to violating the restraining order and received a suspended sentence. In November and December 2018, she was convicted of four counts of harassment and stalking and six counts of again violating the 2016 restraining order. In 2019, she was sentenced to nine years in prison. In sentencing, Judge Sally Cahill pronounced:

The direct consequences of your actions is that for the four families concerned, you have ruined all normal family life. Their children have been unable to attend school normally and are either home-schooled or have to carry tracking devices and alarms. The families have escape routes planned in case of attack and mothers have slept on the floors of their children's bedrooms to protect them. They have had to move homes, they have had businesses ruined as a result of being unable to have an online profile. As if that is not bad enough, for the children, they will never, as things stand at the moment, be able to go online and put in their own names without seeing the vile filth that you have peddled over a period of years. The allegations were of murder, cannibalism, Satanism and sexual abuse. They could not be more serious or vile. The children's lives have been blighted forever. In my judgement, you are an arrogant, malicious, evil and manipulative woman.

Since 2015, at least seven other people have been arrested and charged variously with stalking, intimidation, harassment and contempt of court in connection with the hoax.

== Later coverage ==
A podcast about the affair, titled Hoaxed, was published by Tortoise Media in 2022, while Channel 4 broadcast a documentary, Accused: The Hampstead Paedophile Hoax, in 2024.

== See also ==
- Pizzagate conspiracy theory
- Satanic panic
- Day-care sex-abuse hysteria
