= Thomas Thorp (judge) =

New Zealand judge (1925–2018)

Sir Thomas Murray Thorp KNZM (1 December 1925 – 17 October 2018) was a New Zealand lawyer and jurist who served as a judge of the High Court of New Zealand.

== Professional career ==
From 1963 to 1979, Thorp was the Crown Solicitor in Gisborne. He sat as a judge in the High Court of New Zealand from 1979 until 1996. In 1990, Thorp received the New Zealand 1990 Commemoration Medal. In the 1997 New Year Honours, he was appointed a Knight Companion of the New Zealand Order of Merit, in recognition of his service as a judge of the High Court.

Thorp served as chairman of the National Parole Board and sat as a member of the Court of Appeal.

== Later life and death ==
After his retirement as a judge, Thorp wrote reports into some controversial matters.

In 1997, he reviewed New Zealand's gun control measures, and recommended that all firearms be registered. He also wrote a report into the David Bain case in which he said he was satisfied with the trial verdict.

In 1999, he wrote a report into the Peter Hugh McGregor Ellis case. Thorp expressed misgivings with aspects of the case. He could find no corroboration of the children's claims of sexual abuse. He said that section 23G of the Evidence Act should be repealed because it allowed an expert to say that there was no behaviour inconsistent with sexual abuse. His report recommended that the Justice Ministry obtain the opinion of Stephen J. Ceci with regard to the children's evidence. The Ministry has ignored this and other recommendations from Thorp's report. His report contrasts with that written by Sir Thomas Eichelbaum, which upheld Ellis's conviction.

In 2005, Thorp published a book entitled Miscarriages of Justice. He researched 53 applications for the Royal Prerogative of Mercy and found that at least 20 applicants may have been wrongly imprisoned.

Thorp lived in the Auckland suburb of Parnell. He died on 17 October 2018.
