= Angers pedophile network =

Child sexual abuse scandal in France

The Angers pedophile network case is a French criminal case in which sixty-two people were convicted of sexual abuse committed against forty-five children aged from a few months to 12 years old, between 1999 and 2002. Some of the accused are parents and grandparents of the victims identified.

== Investigation ==
The case was opened with a complaint filed in November 2000 by a 16-year-old girl, who alleged multiple rapes committed between 1991 and 1993. The alleged perpetrator of the attacks was already in prison, having been sentenced in 1996 to ten years of criminal imprisonment in separate case. The Angers juvenile brigade also investigated Éric Joubert, the perpetrator's brother, who had also been convicted in the past for sexual offences and sentenced in 1997 to a two-year prison sentence and one year of probation.

In February 2002, a witness accused her ex-partner of abusing her 5-year-old daughter.

In the course of the investigation into Joubert and his associates, Franck and Patricia Vergondy, parents of four children, were suspected of being at the centre of a child prostitution network. The case gained media attention on March 8, 2002 with the publication of several press articles as well as a report broadcast on the 8 p.m. news of France 2. Around twenty victims were identified and five people were indicted for “rape of a minor under 15 years of age”, “aggravated pimping”, “complicity in rape” and “failure to report a crime”.

In the days that followed, details described as “sordid” by the public prosecutor were revealed by the media. In addition to the incestuous nature of the crimes, the age of the children, which had ranged from 6 months to 12 years, as well as the scale of the network shocked investigators and the public. Coming from particularly disadvantaged backgrounds, the families involved had prostituted their children in exchange for sums deemed “insignificant” by the prosecutor. At 150 to 300 euros per week, it was suggested that these sums were significant for a family living on social benefits.

== See also ==
- Outreau case
