= Freeing Bernie Baran =

- Produced by: Daniel Alexander; Tom Opferman
- Starring: Bernard Baran
- Music by: George Hurd
- Release date: September 11, 2010
- Country: United States
- Language: English

Freeing Bernie Baran is an independent documentary feature film produced by Daniel Alexander and Tom Opferman. The film chronicles the 25-year span from 1984 to 2009 in the criminal court case of "The Commonwealth of Massachusetts versus Bernard F. Baran, Jr."

Bernard Baran was the first person convicted in the day care sex abuse hysteria of the 1980s and 1990s in the United States. The film uses interviews and court documents to show the consequences of homophobia and political ambition. Homophobia played such a significant role in the Baran case that the judge freeing him two decades later equated it with the other dominant aspects of day care panic cases: hysteria and suggestion.

Freeing Bernie Baran made its world premiere on September 11, 2010, at the Austin Gay & Lesbian International Film Festival (aGLIFF23) with Bernie Baran and director Daniel Alexander in attendance. The aGLIFF23 festival guide described the film as "achingly beautiful" and said "if you can only see one film at the festival, this is the one to see" concluding "it will make you angry but leave you with hope.
