= Bernard Baran =

Day care employee wrongfully convicted of sex abuse

- Born: Bernard F. Baran Jr. May 25, 1965
- Died: September 1, 2014 (aged 49); Fitchburg, Massachusetts, U.S.
- Occupation: Day care employee
- Known for: Wrongful conviction in the day-care sex-abuse hysteria

Bernard F. Baran Jr. (May 25, 1965 – September 1, 2014) was an American day care worker wrongfully convicted in the day care sex-abuse hysteria of the 1980s and 1990s. Baran's case spanned almost 25 years from his arrest at the age of nineteen until 2009 when all charges were finally dropped. Baran's case is notable among day care hysteria cases for the level of homophobia present in the court record of the prosecution.

Baran was accused, tried and convicted within a three-month period and sentenced to three life sentences in January 1985. He was released from prison after being granted a new trial in 2006. In 2009, the Massachusetts Appeals Court vacated the convictions, deeming the case "notorious," and citing the behavior of the original prosecutor as "troubling." Baron received a $400,000 settlement from the state of Massachusetts in 2010 and passed away in 2014, eight years after his release.

Unlike other day care cases, Baran's case did not garner much national press coverage. Baran maintained his innocence throughout, making him ineligible for parole. The Baran case is the subject of the 2010 documentary film Freeing Bernie Baran.

== Background ==
Bernard Baran dropped out of school in 9th grade. In 1983, he found a job through an antipoverty program as a teacher's aide at the Early Childhood Development Center (ECDC), in his hometown of Pittsfield, Massachusetts. Shortly before his employment, social workers placed a four-year-old boy at ECDC due to drug abuse and domestic violence in the child's home environment. Eventually, the child ended up in the classroom where Baran worked. In September 1984, accusations of sexual abuse at the Fells Acres Day School in Malden, Massachusetts, made news across the state and beyond. Shortly thereafter, the parents of the boy complained to the board of directors of ECDC that they "didn't want no homo" working with their child. Per court documents, the mother explained, "I had a feeling that if they're gay, they shouldn’t be with kids … They shouldn't get married. They shouldn't have kids. They shouldn't be allowed out in public."

The Board of Directors held a meeting on September 12, 1984, to specifically discuss Baran's homosexuality, and the possibility of terminating his employment because of it. Baran retained his job after being questioned about his homosexuality by his superiors.

== First allegation ==
On October 1, 1984, the parents of the boy in question removed him from ECDC in protest of Baran's continued employment. On October 5, 1984, the parents called the Pittsfield police department drug control unit. They alleged that Bernard Baran molested their son at ECDC. The next day the police began an investigation at ECDC and validated the claim of sexual abuse, as the child tested positive for gonorrhea.

Days before Baran's trial, the child reported he had been abused by his mother's boyfriend rather than Baran. This information was forwarded to the District Attorney's office, but never shared with Baran's defense nor ever prosecuted.

== Hysteria ==
Word of the first allegation broke shortly after the investigation began. Within days the day care center had sponsored a puppet show to facilitate other children's ability to talk about abuse. Multiple children were interviewed with anatomically correct dolls at both of ECDC's locations, one where Baran worked and one where he did not. Videotapes of the interviews (which were later found to be heavily edited) were presented to a grand jury, which indicted Baran on 3 counts of rape and 5 counts of indecent assault on November 5, 1984.

These interview techniques have since been repudiated due to the suggestibility of children. Multiple of the child accusers recanted their claims later or were revealed to be false by the unedited tapes of the interviews.

== Trial ==
Baran's case went from arrest to trial in 105 days, convening in court on January 23, 1985 and receiving significant local media attention. The case was prosecuted by the First Assistant District Attorney Daniel Ford who had led the children through weeks of mock trials to prepare them for testimony.

The courtroom was closed to the public and the press during the children's testimony without any hearing into the necessity for closing the court, which Baran claimed violated his 6th Amendment right to a public trial. Baran was positioned in the court room so that he could not hear the testimony of the children. On January 30, 1985, he received three life sentences for three counts of rape of a child and five counts of indecent assault and battery. His conviction held up on appeal in 1986. The law firm that handled his appeal eventually destroyed his defense case file.

== Motion for new trial ==
In 1999 a new legal team took Baran's case. In a series of hearings from 1999 to 2005, the original defense file was recreated from the contents of the civil suits filed against ECDC after the Baran conviction. The motion for a new trial contained over 300 flawed items in the original trial, including prosecutorial misconduct, ineffective assistance of counsel, and unedited videotapes that revealed the use of suggestive interviewing techniques with the children. The motion rested in June 2005.

== Release and freedom ==
Baran was granted a new trial in 2006. The Berkshire County District Attorney's office appealed the granting of a new trial in 2008. In 2009 the Massachusetts Appeals Court affirmed the 2006 ruling and set aside the 1984 convictions.

In 2010, Baran's lawyers began the process of suing multiple parties in civil court on his behalf. Even though a $400,000.00 settlement was reached in 2010 the state has denied liability and thus has yet to expunge his record.

== Death ==
Baran died suddenly on September 1, 2014, at his home in Fitchburg, Massachusetts. The cause of death was a brain aneurysm.

== See also ==
- List of wrongful convictions in the United States
