= Wenatchee child abuse prosecutions =

Criminal prosecutions in Washington state, U.S.

The Wenatchee child abuse prosecutions in Wenatchee, Washington, US, of 1994 and 1995, were the last "large scale Multi-Victim / Multi-Offender case" during the hysteria over child molestation in the 1980s and early 1990s. Many poor and intellectually disabled suspects pled guilty, while those who hired private lawyers were acquitted. Eventually all those accused in these cases were released, and the authorities paid damages to some of those originally accused.

== Accusations ==
The investigation began in January 1995 when Detective Robert Perez was told by his 13-year-old foster daughter, Donna Perez, that she had been sexually molested. On March 13, 1995, Perez put Donna in his police car with two social services caseworkers and they drove through Wenatchee and East Wenatchee. Donna pointed out houses and buildings where she says she and other children were repeatedly raped and molested since January 1988. She listed 22 locations. This drive became known locally as the "Parade of Homes" or the "drive-by".

Many of the people convicted were poor, had intellectual disabilities and were on welfare, and their lawyers stated that their guilty pleas were coerced. In 1995, after Pastor Robert Roberson criticized the investigation, he was arrested and charged with eleven counts of the sexual abuse of a child. Roberson and his wife were acquitted of all charges. Perez's foster daughter later recanted and apologized to Roberson, claiming that Perez had pressured her. Reporter Tom Grant broadcast part of her recantation on KREM-TV.

== Arrests ==
Forty-three adults were arrested on 29,726 charges of child sex abuse, involving 60 children in 1995. Parents and Sunday school teachers were charged, and many were convicted of abusing children, often including their own, or their foster children. Several of the accused claimed that their confessions were coerced. "None of the interviews, or the adults' confessions, was taped", nor did Perez take notes. Sixteen adults entered Alford pleas; most of these were poor or "functionally mentally challenged".

On March 23, 1995, Robert Roberson, pastor of some of the accused, criticized the authorities at a public meeting. Five days later, the Robersons were arrested. Unable to afford the $1,000,000 bail for each, they were held in jail where Robert was beaten. Four months later they were each released on a reduced $12,500 bail to await trial.

Grant said that three defendants were arrested shortly after sharing their criticism of these cases with him. After case worker Paul Glassen criticized the way that Perez interviewed the foster daughter of Robert Devereaux, he was arrested for "tampering with a witness", and later fled to Canada with his family.

== Trials ==
Prosecutors were unable to provide any physical evidence to support the charges against the Robersons. The main witness was Perez' foster daughter; Perez was the investigator of the cases. The Roberson's 5-year-old daughter testified that her parents never abused her, so Judge T. W. Small dismissed two charges that they had. In his testimony, Perez admitted to physically hurting his foster daughter that was accusing others. The jury acquitted the Robersons of all remaining charges; one juror reported that acquitting them "was not a difficult decision for us." Some jurors met with the Robersons after the trial; Roberson reported they were "so angry and upset that this case was even brought to trial".

A jury also acquitted Honnah Sims; one juror criticized the lack of evidence and described the case as "a witch hunt", and the jury foreman criticized the case as a waste of money given the weakness of the evidence.

Concerned Citizens for Legal Accountability, formed to ask for an outside investigation, filed a complaint with the state Commission on Judicial Conduct criticizing judges T.W. "Chip" Small (judge in the Roberson case) and Carol Wardell (judge in earlier cases) with professional misconduct. The judges had earlier asked for a visiting judge to investigate.

== Conviction review summary ==
Critics maintained that these cases were mishandled by the police and proper protocol was not followed when interviewing the children. Some higher courts agreed, so those who were convicted were freed and had their convictions overturned or pleaded guilty on lesser charges. Five served their full sentences before their cases were overturned. Some lost parental rights. By 2000, the last person in custody, Michael Rose, was released, after a judge vacated his March 1995 convictions.

Washington Governor Mike Lowry requested a federal review, but U.S. Attorney General Janet Reno declined to involve the national Justice Department in these cases. The FBI did not question anyone; instead they shipped Reno documents which she found "do not present evidence of prosecutable violations of federal civil rights law." Other legal watchdogs such as the state Commission on Judicial Conduct and the ACLU declined to criticize these prosecutions.

== Culpability ==
In 1996, a consultant, retired Bellevue Police Chief D.P. Van Blaricom, hired by a city insurer who looked into how the Wenatchee police ran the child abuse investigations, stated that the cases were handled properly. In 1998, Phillip Esplin, a forensic psychologist for the National Institutes of Health's Child Witness Project said that "Wenatchee may be the worst example ever of mental health services being abused by a state ... to control and manage children who have been frightened and coerced into falsely accusing their parents and neighbors of the most heinous of crimes." In 2001, a jury found the city of Wenatchee and Douglas County, Washington negligent in the 1994-1995 investigations. They awarded $3 million to a couple who had been wrongly accused in the inquiry, but the state supreme court later upheld an appeals court ruling reducing this award to the Sims.

Following a "brief training course", Robert Perez was rotated into sex-crimes investigation in 1994 despite having been arrested, involvement in a child custody dispute, and a 1989 performance evaluation that said he "likes confrontation and likes having power over people". But the Seattle Post-Intelligencer argued that while Perez got a lot of the criticism, "he was just the point man for an investigation either directed by or undertaken with the active involvement of CPS officials", and the Wall Street Journal blamed "the entire law enforcement establishment [including] the prosecutors". Perez died in 2013 at age 60.

Pierce County public defender Kathryn Lyon compiled "The Wenatchee Report", which "purport[ed] to show civil-rights violations involving children and families in Chelan and Douglas counties." Lyon described the prosecutions as "a great example of a social phenomenon that we haven't seen since Salem or the McCarthy era". Perez attempted to subpoena Lyon's sources, but was unsuccessful, except for a tape that Lyon had already shared with others. This work formed the basis of Lyon's 1998 book, Witch Hunt: A True Story of Social Hysteria and Abused Justice.

== Aftermath ==
Courts have freed all those once imprisoned in these prosecutions. Carol and Mark Doggett (whose daughter had been taken to a mental facility in Idaho to recover memories against them, and then ran away while denying having been abused) were freed, but then still required legal assistance to get their children returned to their custody.

Those once accused filed lawsuits against the authorities who once prosecuted them. The Robersons and Sims settled with the state of Washington for $850,000 in a case that was split off from a suit against the police due to a clerical error. The city of Wenatchee paid the Robersons a settlement of $700,000. The city was fined almost as much during the civil trial for withholding evidence. While on trial for child abuse, Douglas County also prosecuted the Robersons for welfare fraud, a case the Robersons described as "harassment". After their acquittal, they plea-bargained this case to community service for Robert. The last lawsuit against the authorities in these cases was settled in 2009, with the children of Harold and Idella Everett, who initially made an Alford plea (pled no contest), receiving $120,000. Manuel Hidalgo Rodriguez, convicted in 1995, was awarded $2.9 million from his defense attorney Ed Stevensen, who took a job with the prosecutor 3 weeks after losing his case, but in the end received $689,000.

Kerri Ann Knowles Hill, whose trial was postponed due to the "raging hysteria" of her accuser, gave up her rights to sue for damages and speak publicly about her case, in exchange for having her case dropped. Sadie Hughes (a.k.a. Sadie Knowles), described as "low IQ", and "who described herself as developmentally disabled", said "I pleaded guilty to something I didn't understand," and must continue to register as a sex offender.

In 1995, journalist Tom Grant of KREM-TV won a George Polk Award for Excellence in Journalism for his coverage of these cases. In 1997, KREM and Grant won an Alfred I. duPont-Columbia University Award "for Investigative Reporting on the Wenatchee Child Sex Ring." Grant first used the term "witch hunt" to describe these cases in March, 1995. Following this, he was "accused, indirectly, of committing some of the same crimes". In September 1995, Grant wrote, "Now I know what it's like to be falsely accused. ... I doubt anyone is really investigating me, but I do believe they are trying to discredit my work." Grant later concluded that these cases involved "good intentions, driven to hysteria, and then funneled through some people, particularly Perez, who did not use the correct techniques in investigating these cases".

In 1997, Pastor Roby and Connie Roberson attended the "Day of Contrition" conference in Salem, Massachusetts, along with other victims and experts of the day-care sex-abuse hysteria.

In 1999, the Washington state legislature passed the "Perez Bill" which required child abuse investigators to keep accurate records of their interviews and forbade them from investigating cases involving their own children.

== See also ==
- Day care sex abuse hysteria
- McMartin preschool trial
- Moral panic
- Satanic ritual abuse
- Witch-hunt
