= Reflex anal dilation =

Reflexive dilation of the human anus in response to stimulation

Reflex anal dilation (RAD) is the reflexive dilation of the human anus to a diameter greater than two centimeters in response to the parting of the buttocks or anal stimulation, such as brushing with a medical instrument. RAD was theorized to be a clinical marker associated with anal sexual assault in children, and has been associated with other signs of sexual assault but also appears in children with severe chronic constipation and those subject to invasive medical treatments of the anus. The finding of RAD alone is not considered indicative of sexual abuse, and a normative sample of children not suspected of having been sexually abused found that 49 per cent of children showed anal dilation either continuously or intermittently, though the dilation exceeded 20 mm in only 1.2 per cent of cases.

In 1986, Marietta Higgs learned of the RAD connection with sexual assault at a conference where it was presented by Jane Wynne and Christopher Hobbs. Higgs used this RAD diagnosis extensively the following year, leading to the Cleveland child abuse scandal. It was discredited during the trial as the sole indication of sexual abuse, determined to be considered a sign of sexual assault by a tiny minority of British doctors. RAD as a clinical marker for sexual abuse is now considered discredited. However Hobbs was still studying RAD in 2014.

== See also ==
- Anal wink
- Body memory
