= Fabrice Burgaud =

French magistrate

- Born: October 23, 1971; Niort, France
- Education: Institut d'études politiques de Bordeaux
- Occupation: Magistrate

Fabrice Burgaud (born October 23, 1971) is a French magistrate, best known for presiding over the Outreau case in 2004. On February 8, 2006, Burgaud appeared before the members of the French Parliament in a review of his actions as magistrate during that trial.

The event was covered by several French television channels (including TF1, France 2 and La Chaîne parlementaire) and was also reported by various radio stations. Burgaud was quoted as saying: "Today, maybe more than any other, I can feel the pain [of the acquitted men, of whom some were present during the audition], imagine what they have experienced, their imprisonment, the separation from their loved ones, their integrity put into question... I take full responsibility for the investigation and I do not wish to hide from any of that responsibility".

He told the parliamentary inquiry that he "was honest and entirely unprejudiced in his judgement." He cited as evidence the disturbing nature of the children's testimonies, which referred to details of terrible abuse.

== Bibliography ==
- Patrick Maisonneuve (2015), Justice et politique : le couple infernal (in French), Plon
- Florence Aubenas (2005), La Méprise : l'affaire d'Outreau (in French), Paris, éditions du Seuil, "H. C. Essais"
- Father Dominique Wiel (2006), Que Dieu ait pitié de nous (in French), Paris, Oh! éditions
- Marie-Christine Gryson-Dejehansart (2009), Outreau : la vérité abusée, 12 enfants reconnus victimes (in French), Paris, Hugo & Co.
- Jacques Thomet (2013), Retour à Outreau, Kontre-Kulture

== Filmography ==
- Rémi Lainé (2011), Outreau, notre histoire (in French), documentary
- Vincent Garenq (2011), Guilty
- Serge Garde (2013), Outreau, l'autre vérité (in French), documentary

== See also ==
- Outreau case
