= Orkney child abuse scandal =

1991 scandal in Orkney, Scotland

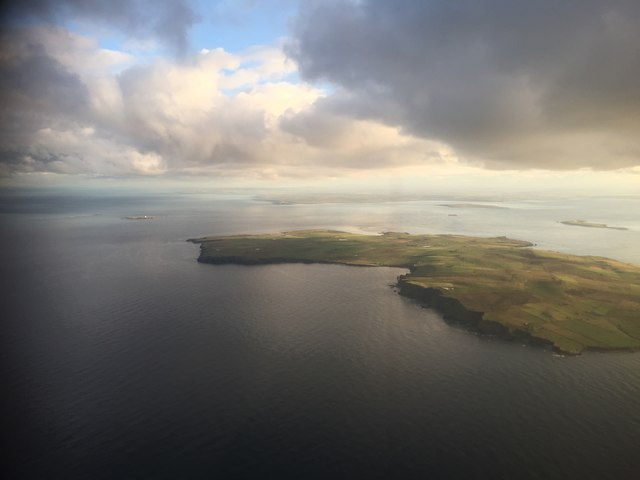
South Ronaldsay (photographed in 2017), where the scandal allegedly began

The Orkney child abuse scandal was a controversy which began on 27 February 1991 when social workers and police removed five boys and four girls, all between the ages of eight and fifteen, from their homes in South Ronaldsay, Orkney due to allegations of child abuse. The children denied that any abuse had occurred, and medical examinations did not reveal any evidence of abuse.

== Background ==
=== The 'W' family ===
The 'W' family, two parents and fifteen children, moved from Rousay to South Ronaldsay, Orkney in 1985. In 1985, the Orkney Social Work Department became aware of concerns regarding abuse towards the children by the father, and on 16 March 1987 the father pled guilty to child sexual abuse and was sentenced to seven years imprisonment. The family remained in contact with Social Work, and in 1989 further concern was raised following allegations by one of the female W children. Eight of the W children were taken to places of safety as a result of allegations of sexual abuse by siblings on 22 June and Place of Safety Orders were discharged on 26 June 1989. On 13 July, the Children's Hearing decided that the youngest W children should return home under supervision, with the condition that they not have contact with their older brothers. The Royal Scottish Society for Prevention of Cruelty to Children (RSSPCC) (now known as the charity Children 1st) expressed concern about the provision of care for children, by Orkney services, and submitted this in a letter to the Chief Executive of the Orkney Islands Council on 2 February 1990.

The children's mother, Mrs W, was assigned two social workers in 1989; these were Michelle Miller and Rab Murphy. Both social workers expressed difficulty in speaking with Mrs W because of the frequent presence of visitors to her home such as Mrs T, Mrs M, Mrs McKenzie and the local GP Dr Broadhurst. The M and T families were recorded, by the social work department, as helping with tutoring the W children, babysitting and providing Mrs W with support when corresponding with authorities. In October 1990, Mrs Millar assigned Miss Lynn Drever to work specifically with one of the female W children, OW.

In November 1990, OW, alleged that she was the subject of sexual contact with her older brothers and a Presbyterian minister. On 1 November 1990, a Place of Safety Order was obtained for OW. The Social Work Department worked with the Northern Constabulary to investigate the allegations and by 6 November, Place of Safety Orders had been made for seven of the younger W children, aged under sixteen years old. The following day, 7 November, The Children's Hearing for OW was held and Mrs W attended, with Mrs M, Mrs T, and Mrs McKenzie.

All the children, when taken to the mainland under place of safety, were medically examined except for MW. The doctor who examined OW reported evidence of "sexual penetration" that occurred after her father's imprisonment, and evidence of "chronic penetrative abuse" was reported regarding AW, QW and SW, the latter said to have occurred after her father's imprisonment. On 23 January 1991, a hearing resulted in the children being subject to supervision order with a condition of residence away from home, and their mother was denied contact with them for three months. Prior to this, in December 1990, the children had been placed in more permanent placements in the Highland region which separated some of the children.

Support for the W family increased during this time, as supporters garnered publicity protesting against the removal of the W children. Mr and Mrs M, Mrs T, the Reverend Mr and Mrs McKenzie, Mrs Oakes, and Mrs W raised their concern with the local MP, local Member of the European Parliament and the Scottish Office. Contact, by Mrs M and the T family, was also made to some of the W children's foster parents, social work on the mainland and sent presents and letters to children. Mrs Millar, social work, found references in some of the letters disturbing, for example, a letter from Mrs T to BW about fixing an electric heater, because she did not see why a child of BW's age should be fixing electrical appliances and thought there may be an ulterior meaning. However, Millar and social work did not address this issue with Mrs T.

==== Interviews with the 'W' children ====
Social workers and members of the RSSPCC agreed that the interviews should be either videotaped or audio recorded, but not all interviews were. Interviews were held with the younger W children by a social worker, staff of the RSSPCC and with the police, from November 1990 to March 1991, in some cases. Three of the younger W children made separate allegations of sexual abuse and recounted taking part in outdoor rituals in a quarry and on a beach in South Ronaldsay. The children mentioned Reverend McKenzie, the M family, the T family, the B family, and the H family. On 6 February 1991, when interviewed, MW described dancing to popular music with the children and adults and was quoted saying "we don't need to talk about the dirty stuff."

=== Removal of the M, T, B and H children ===
By 13 February, Mr Lee and Mrs Millar agreed that they should seek the removal of nine children under Place of Safety Orders, because they believed there was corroborated evidence, provided by the interviews, of sexual abuse. The removal was of the children from the four families was planned to be simultaneous because social work, and the authorities involved, did not want the families to communicate with one another, hide some of the children or destroy evidence. Prior to the removals, social work sought to find out more information about the four families and the children, and as part of this they requested information from the schools the children attended.

At 6:00 a.m. on 27 February 1991, the team of social workers and police met at Kirkwall Police Station. They distributed and carried out the Place of Safety Orders for the nine children of the four families at 7:00 a.m. Preparation was also made, in the meantime, for the safe houses for the children. Parents were refused access to the children once they were removed from their homes, and the children were not allowed to bring personal possessions. Parents and the Church minister, Maurice McKenzie, were interviewed by the police. The children from the H and T families were allocated to foster carers in the Highland region, and the children from the B family, and SM were placed with foster carers in Strathclyde.

The removal of the children received significant press coverage, and became known in newspapers as the "dawn raids". Media attention was both from the UK and international; for example, in an article entitled "Social workers in hot water for removing kids" in the American newspaper Record-Journal, Laurence Marks writes:

The terrifying dawn raid, in which distraught children were dragged weeping from their parents, had horrified the islanders of this quiet, law-abiding community, and shocked the rest of the nation.

— Laurence Marks, Record-Journal

The case was covered by the BBC on Nine O'clock News, ITV News at Ten, and Channel 4 News in March 1991. In a news report on ITV on 12 March 1991, the case is referred to as involving "ritual abuse" and "dawn raids". In this report by Bob Parker, some of the parents of the children who were removed are interviewed for the first time. Reverend McKenzie is interviewed and denies the allegations describing them as "bizarre". Paul Lee, director of Social Work at the time, said "I'm satisfied that we did everything we should have done in an appropriate way", but the families lawyer John Moir said that social workers did not follow the Cleveland and Rochdale guidelines.

== Proof hearing ==
The case came to court on 3 April 1991, by acting Orkney Reporter Gordon Sloan following the parents' refusal to accept the grounds of referral to the Children's Panel. In a 1992 article The Independent explain the role of the Reporter in the Scottish system:

Scotland has no juvenile courts so the panels, sitting as childrens' [sic] hearings, deal with minor crime and also decide what action to take in child protection cases. The idea is to separate the functions, so that courts decide any disputed facts of a case, while children's hearings decide the treatment.

— The Independent, "The Orkney Inquiry: 'Reporter' is central figure in emotional saga"

The proceedings were conducted in private, without press present. After a single day, the presiding judge, Sheriff David Kelbie, dismissed the case as fatally flawed and the children of the four families were allowed to return home. The judge criticised the social workers involved, saying that their handling of the case had been "fundamentally flawed". He found in summary that "these proceedings are so fatally flawed as to be incompetent" and that the children concerned had been separated and subjected to repeated cross-examinations almost as if the aim were to force confessions rather than to assist in therapy. Where two children made similar statements about abuse, this appeared to be the result of "repeated coaching". Sheriff Kelbie added that in his view "There is no lawful authority for that whatsoever" and he also said that he was unclear what the supposed evidence provided by the social services proved.

The children were returned by plane to Kirkwall airport on 4 April 1991 where they were reunited with their parents. The objects seized during the raids were later returned; they included a videotape of the TV show Blackadder, a detective novel by Ngaio Marsh, and a model aeroplane made by one of the children from two pieces of wood, which had been identified by social workers as a "wooden cross". The minister was asked to sign for the return of "three masks, two hoods, one black cloak", but refused to sign until the inventory was altered to "three nativity masks, two academic hoods, one priest's robe".

On 1 May, the Crown Office issued a statement in which it was said no one would be charged with any offence, and there would be no continuing criminal investigation.

=== Appeal ===
The Reporter, Gordon Sloan, appealed against the dismissal of the case and on 15 April 1991, it was confirmed that an application for appeal for the case had been submitted. It was, however, decided that regardless of the outcome of the appeal the case would not proceed further as a criminal investigation. The Court of Session, sitting as Scotland's premier civil appeal court, upheld the appeal, stating that the Sheriff had "allowed himself to form views about the contents [of the social workers' evidence that] would have made it impossible for him to bring a fair and balanced judgement to the issues".

Gordon Sloan decided to abandon the appeal and took the view that in the light of factors including the publicity since Kelbie's decision, the case was severely compromised.

== The Clyde Inquiry ==
In June 1991, the UK Government announced that there would be a public inquiry under Lord James John Clyde with the remit to investigate the authorities' actions and to make recommendations for future place of safety orders. Indeed, on 19 June 1991, the Secretary of State for Scotland, Ian Lang, explained the remit of the inquiry, which related to:

1. The decision to seek authority to take to a place of safety nine children resident in South Ronaldsay.
2. The removal of those children from their homes on 27 February 1991.
3. The detention of those children in places of safety following the removal and until they returned to their home.
4. The decision not to continue proceedings before the Sheriff for a finding on the evidence.

Until March 1992, the Inquiry took oral and written evidence in Kirkwall.

"The Report of the Inquiry into the Removal of Children from Orkney in February 1991" was published on 27 October 1992. It described the successful appeal against the first judgement as "most unfortunate" and criticised all those involved, including the social workers, the police, and the Orkney Islands Council. Social workers' training, methods, and judgement were given special condemnation, and the report stated that the concept of "ritual abuse" was "not only unwarrantable at present but may affect the objectivity of practitioners and parents".

The Clyde Inquiry report did provide greater insight into the initial abuse allegations by the W children, details of the interviews with the nine children and their foster families, and the planning of the authorities involved, most notably social work departments.

=== Legacy ===
The Clyde Inquiry influenced much of what was included in the subsequent Children (Scotland) Act of 1995. The Act provided greater tightening of conditions around child protection orders, and clarified the conditions under which suspected abusers should be removed from home.

== Criticism and analysis ==
In her 2013 memoir If Only I Had Told, Esther W writes how she was abused by an unnamed care worker, when she was taken into care after the abuse by her father. Esther says that she never told anyone about the abuse by the care worker, and that the authorities assumed that the abuse was perpetrated by her brothers and thus started the wider investigation of child sexual abuse on South Ronaldsay.

In her 2016 book, Tackling Child Sexual Abuse: Radical Approaches to Prevention, Protection and Support, Sarah Nelson is critical of the media's representation of the case. Nelson believes that some reporting was problematic or inaccurate, arguing that allegations were explained as being proven completely unfounded when, Nelson writes, there is possible evidence to support belief in the allegations. Nelson quotes, a then Strathclyde care manager, Phil Greene's contribution to 2006 documentary The Accused. Greene described the journey back to Kirkwall when the children were to be reunited with their families, saying "They changed and became hyperactive, with sexualised talk and sexual propositions to adults on the aeroplane." Nelson also quotes the reaction of one of the children cited in Lord Clyde's Inquiry Report:

She had been given a parcel containing cards and articles from Orkney, but she flung them all on the floor as if in a fit of rage. She was extremely distressed. She cried and indulged in very aggressive behaviour which was quite unlike her, smashing a doll on the ground. She started sucking her thumb. She seemed shocked and bewildered. She said she did not want to go home and stood like a wooden doll refusing to get dressed. She left the foster carer’s house in tears.

— Clyde, Inquiry Report (1992)

The British Association of Social Workers (BASW) responded to the BBC interview with Esther W in 2013. Ruth Stark MBE, then manager of the Scottish ASW, lauded Esther for her bravery in speaking out, but Stark also spoke about the circumstances in which the case was treated by the court in 1991, and the actions of the Sheriff. Lord Hope, at the Court of Session, criticised the Sheriff for not allowing some of the evidence to be heard. Stark said "This evidence may have included medical and forensic evidence which remains unheard. The manner in which information was given by the children, whether willingly or as alleged by hearsay, by interrogation remains untested. Without being in possession of all the facts any judgement made from outside must be treated with caution."

In her book "Framing Abuse: Media Influence and Public Understanding of Sexual Violence" researcher Jenny Kitzinger is critical of the way the media portrayed the Orkney case, specifically the framing of the "dawn raids." Kitzinger conducted research on a focus group, who recall the case at the time it was ongoing, to determine what they remember about the case from the media at the time. The results suggested that people recalled most; the prominent coverage of the "dawn raids", "dawn raids" as a phrase most associated with the case, and that media coverage was dramatic and instilled sympathy within the public towards the parents.

=== Interviewing techniques ===
Liz McLean, the social worker who led the interviews with the children, had also been involved in the 1990 Rochdale "Satanic Abuse" case. She was later sharply criticised by Lord Clyde in the official inquiry into the South Ronaldsay case, and in another investigation into similar allegations in Ayrshire.

During the investigation the children received several lengthy interviews. McLean was later described by several of the children as a terrifying figure who was "fixated on finding satanic abuse", and other children described how she urged them to draw circles and faces, presumably as evidence indicating abusive rites. These techniques were strongly criticised by Sheriff Kelbie.

One of the children later said of the interviews that "in order to get out of a room, after an hour or so of saying, 'No, this never happened', you'd break down."

One of the children later said:

I would never say that a child's testimony in the company of Liz McLean at the time [is reliable]. She was a very manipulative woman, and she would write what she wanted to write. I would doubt any child supposedly making allegations in that situation."

— Interview with "Karen", 2006

== Victim lawsuit ==
In March 1996 the families involved in the case accepted an apology from Orkney Islands Council, and they received compensation £10,000 for each child and £5,000 for each parent involved. However, the W children did not receive an apology or compensation. Esther W said "I just felt like we were very much an aside, as opposed to the people who were at the centre of it."

In September 2006 it was announced that one person, who had been 8 years old when she was taken into care by social workers in November 1990, intended to sue the council. She said that she had been the victim of a "witch hunt" by overzealous social workers determined to break up her family. She said that the interview techniques used at the time were designed to break the children down, and that she was bribed with sweets to tell social workers what they wanted to hear. In February 2008 it was reported that she would receive legal aid to sue the council. In 2012, it was identified that the case was to be brought about by May Willsher, who also said she was sexually abused as a foster child. However, as of 2024, no further information has been provided regarding the details of this lawsuit.

== Media ==
In 1992, an episode of the television show Rumpole of the Bailey dealt with the Satanic Abuse hysteria. Called "Rumpole and the Children of the Devil", it dealt with a panic over children, including leading questioning of them, wild accusations, and taking of the children into care. It was inspired by the Orkney case, and earlier cases.

On 22 August 2006 a documentary on the case titled Accused produced by Blast! Films was transmitted by BBC2. The programme included dramatic reconstructions of some of the interviews conducted with the children by social workers, and allowed participants in the affair—including the children—to speak for themselves.

== See also ==
- Day-care sex-abuse hysteria
- Peter Ellis (childcare worker)
- St Helena child abuse scandal
