= Anal wink =

Contraction of the external anal sphincter

The anal wink, anal reflex, perineal reflex, or anocutaneous reflex is the reflexive contraction of the external anal sphincter upon stroking of the skin around the anus.

A noxious or tactile stimulus will cause a wink contraction of the anal sphincter muscles and also flexion. The stimulus is detected by the nociceptors in the perineal skin to the pudendal nerve, where a response is integrated by the spinal cord sacral segments S2-S4.

The absence of this reflex indicates that there is an interruption of the reflex arc, or damage to the spinal cord, which may be in the sensory afferent limb or the motor efferent limb. The synapse between the afferent and efferent limbs occurs in the lowest sacral segments of the spinal cord.

== See also ==
- Reflex anal dilation
