= Peter Ellis (childcare worker) =

New Zealander wrongfully convicted of child abuse (1958–2019)

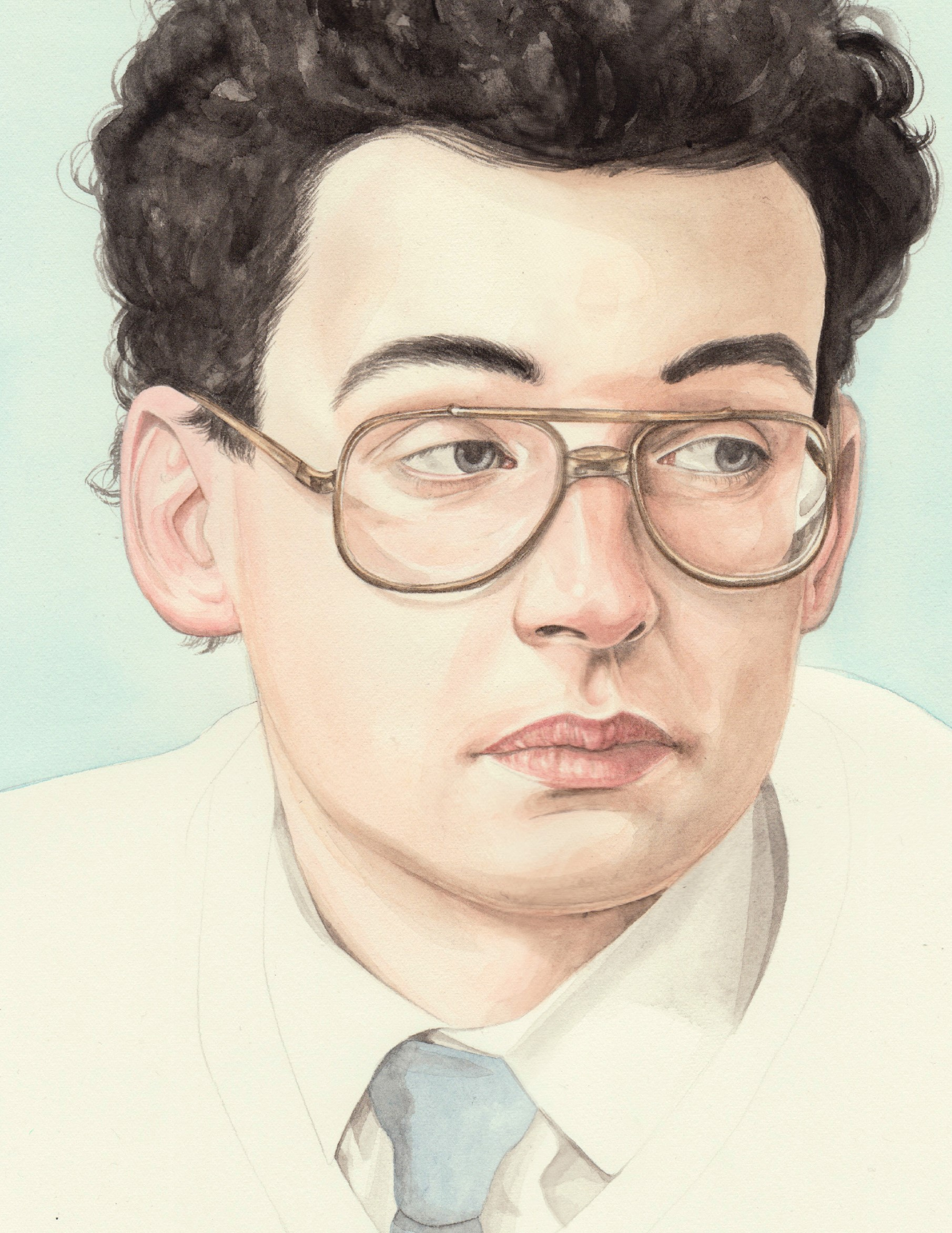
- Ellis on the cover of North&South magazine in November 2015
- Born: Peter Hugh McGregor Ellis; 30 March 1958; Christchurch, New Zealand
- Died: 4 September 2019 (aged 61)
- Occupation: Childcare worker

Peter Hugh McGregor Ellis (30 March 1958 – 4 September 2019) was a New Zealand childcare worker who was convicted of child sexual abuse, but later had his conviction quashed. He was at the centre of one of the country's most enduring judicial controversies, after being found guilty in June 1993 in the High Court on 16 counts of sexual offences involving children in his care at the Christchurch Civic Creche and sentenced to 10 years' imprisonment. He maintained his innocence until his death 26 years later and was supported by many New Zealanders in his attempts to overturn his convictions, although others believed he was guilty. Concerns about the reliability of the convictions centred on far-fetched stories told by many of the children (alleging Satanic ritual abuse) and the interview techniques used to obtain their testimony.

In 1994, Ellis took his case to the Court of Appeal which quashed convictions on three of the charges but upheld the sentence. His conviction and sentence were upheld in his second appearance before the Court of Appeal in October 1999. In March 2000, former Chief Justice Sir Thomas Eichelbaum was appointed to conduct a ministerial inquiry reviewing the children's evidence. His report upheld the guilty verdicts. The same month Governor-General Sir Michael Hardie Boys rejected Ellis' third bid for pardon on the advice of Justice Minister Phil Goff, who was satisfied with Eichelbaum's finding that Ellis had failed to prove his convictions were unsafe. Ellis refused to attend parole board hearings while in prison because he would have to confess to the crimes in order to obtain early release.

Ellis was eventually released in February 2000 after serving seven years in prison. After his release, he continued campaigning to clear his name. In 2019, nineteen years after he was released, he appealed to the Supreme Court to have his conviction overturned. Although he died of cancer before the appeal could be heard, the Supreme Court allowed the appeal in the interests of justice and delivered a judgment in October 2022. The Supreme Court quashed Ellis' convictions, finding that there were problems with the evidence of the main prosecution witness, a psychiatrist, and the jury had not been fairly informed of the risk of contamination of the children's evidence. This marked the first time that a conviction has been quashed posthumously in New Zealand.

The Ellis case was one of several similar high-profile child abuse cases around the world in the 1980s and early 1990s as part of the Satanic panic, and has been mentioned as a cause in the decline in the number of male teachers in New Zealand schools. Two books and numerous articles have been written about the case.

== Personal life ==
Ellis was the eldest of four children. His parents were teachers who separated when he was nine. He left school in 1975 to take up tobacco picking in Motueka. After two years overseas, he returned to New Zealand. He then had a part-time job in a bakery in the 1980s which eventually became full-time. When he left this job and applied for unemployment benefits, authorities discovered he had received dole payments to which he was not entitled. He was prosecuted and convicted in 1986 of "misleading a social welfare officer" and sentenced to 80 hours community service.

Ellis carried out his community service at the Christchurch Civic Creche. His supervisor, Dora Reinfeld, later reported that "Peter [...] provided some hilarious puppetry shows— one of which we had to abandon as staff and children 'got out of hand'". Ellis became a relieving worker, and Reinfeld's next monthly report said: "Peter Ellis has fitted in extremely well and puts lots of energy into programme planning. Fantastic team spirit." Ellis's pre-sentencing report said, "The overall picture gained of Peter Ellis is that of an outgoing, uninhibited, unconventional person given to putting plenty of enthusiasm and energy into his work and social activities, sometimes to the point of being risqué and outrageous."

Before his imprisonment, Ellis had sexual relationships lasting for periods of two to five years with both men and women. He told Lynley Hood, "In a relationship with a woman I was, for want of a better word, bisexual, and with a man I was monogamous." Ellis was described by Hood as appearing "blatantly homosexual", due to his bright clothes, long hair, makeup and demeanour. After his release, he lived an isolated life, settling in the small community of Leithfield Beach in north Canterbury.

In July 2019, Ellis was diagnosed with terminal cancer. He died on 4 September 2019 while appealing his conviction at the age of 61.

== Investigations ==
The creche building in January 2006. The door to the toilet lobby, clearly visible, has not been changed since 1991. It features a large glass window and was kept open during the daily operation of the creche. The premises continued to operate as a day care centre until February 2011.

=== First allegation and police investigation ===
Ellis loved animals and kept rabbits, cats and dogs as pets. In late September 1991, the mother of a four-year-old boy at the creche, a social worker who had herself recovered memories of sexual abuse, bought a black puppy from him. Ellis showed her son how to identify the puppy's sex.

A few months later, in November 1991, the mother alleged that her son said he "didn't like Peter's black penis". His mother, who had written a handbook on sexual abuse, concluded her son had been sexually abused. She made a formal complaint to the creche in November 1991. After a brief investigation, the police decided there was no case to answer, but Ellis had already been suspended from work. The mother then withdrew her son from the creche and enrolled him into a different Christchurch daycare centre. Shortly thereafter, she alleged a male worker at this second creche had also abused her son. The police investigated and again found no evidence to support the allegation.

Ellis was popular with children and parents at the creche. In the week following his November 1991 suspension, inspectors from the Education Review Office spent a week at the Civic Creche observing its daily operation. The office subsequently issued a favourable report, stating that the staff "ensure personal needs are met with warmth, care and consideration", and that the children "appear happy, inquisitive and sociable" and "have high self-esteem".

=== Second police investigation ===
Even though police concluded no abuse had occurred, some parents started asking their children about what went on at the creche and then shared these stories with other parents. The Department of Social Welfare was called in to conduct formal interviews with many of these children. A social welfare psychologist, Sue Sidey, initially revealed that there were six children for whom she felt there were grounds for concern, although the children made no disclosures of any indecent touching by a creche staff member. More parents became concerned that something must have happened. As the social welfare interviews continued, claims about bizarre sexual abuse incidents began to surface. A meeting was held at the creche attended by staff members, a group of concerned parents and representatives from the Social Welfare Department. In response, the police reopened their investigation.

Altogether, at least 127 children were interviewed. Some detectives believed that up to 80 had been abused. Ellis was accused, among other things, of "sodomising children, forcing them to eat his faeces, urinating on them, suspending them in cages, taking them on terrifying trips of abuse through tunnels, ceilings and trapdoors". Other allegations included children being forced into a steaming hot oven or buried in coffins; one boy claimed he had his belly-button removed with pliers. Allegations which emerged later as the interviews progressed included "Asian men dressed as cowboys, Masonic lodges, cemeteries, the Park Royal Hotel and private houses far from the creche", and "the notorious 'circle incident' where Ellis and his co-workers supposedly took a group of children to 404 Hereford St on the other side of town and made them stand naked and kick each other while the adults danced around them ... Alleged by one parent, was the sacrifice of a boy called Andrew." No child was actually reported missing by anyone involved. The allegations were similar to those made in other Satanic ritual abuse cases.

=== Arrests ===
==== Arrest of Ellis ====
The police arrested Ellis on 30 March 1992, charging him with the first of what would eventually be 45 counts of sexually abusing 20 different children at the creche. By the time the case went to trial, the Crown had reduced the number of charges to 28, involving 13 complainants. Some charges were dropped because the crown prosecutor, Brent Stanaway, did not want to put the more bizarre claims made by some of the children before a conservative Christchurch jury.

==== Arrest of colleagues and closure of creche ====
In addition to interviews conducted by Sue Sidey, the Christchurch City Council, which owned the creche, requested that psychologist and sex therapist Rosemary Smart review the management practices at the creche. Even though Smart's report was completed in July 1992, nearly 12 months before Ellis' trial, she seems to have assumed he was guilty; although she uses the word "alleged" occasionally, journalist Cate Brett said "the report reads as if the abuse had happened and Ellis had been convicted". Smart suggested that female staff may have been involved with abuse at the Civic Creche. She quoted research by the New Hampshire sociologist David Finkelhor, whose 1987 book, Nursery Crimes, became the source for American believers in ritual abuse occurring in creches. Finkelhor's work has since been discredited.

After Smart's report was completed in July 1992, a copy was given to police. Detectives said her report was central to their decision to investigate four of Ellis's female colleagues at the creche. Their houses were searched for everything from pornography to babies' bodies. Nothing was found. In September 1992, the Ministry of Education suspended the creche's licence and it was closed.

The four female staff members were arrested on 1 October 1992 amid considerable televised publicity. At depositions they faced 15 charges that included sexual violation, indecent assault and one charge of performing an indecent act (having sex with Ellis) in a public place. Judge Williamson subsequently discharged them on the basis that the evidence against them was of "insufficient weight" and that the publicity meant their chances of a fair trial would be prejudiced by their association with Ellis. Although the charges were dropped, their careers were ruined. In March 1995, the four female employees and six other former staff who had also lost their jobs were awarded $1 million by the Employment Court for unjustified dismissal. In September 1996 the Court of Appeal reduced the payment to around $80,000, which for some staff was not enough to pay their legal costs.

== Trial ==
Barristers Rob Harrison and Siobhan McNulty represented Ellis; Brent Stanaway and Chris Lange appeared for the Crown. The offences were alleged to have taken place at unspecified times and dates between 1 May 1986 (four months before Ellis started work at the creche) and 1 October 1992 (11 months after he left the creche, and a month after the creche was closed). Defence counsel, Rob Harrison, wanted the jury to see the children's videotaped testimony containing the bizarre allegations as "he believed they would cast reasonable doubt on the more credible testimony." However, Justice Williamson ruled that these tapes were not relevant. In A City Possessed, Lynley Hood observed: "[Judge] Williamson's rulings before and during the trial meant Ellis' lawyer Rob Harrison was effectively hamstrung – the jury did not get to hear the most bizarre of the children's allegations, but did learn of the highly prejudicial but irrelevant conversations Ellis had about unusual sexual practices between consenting adults."

Psychiatrist Karen Zelas was the prosecution's expert witness. She also supervised the social workers conducting the children's interviews and advised the police about how they should conduct their investigation. She testified that the complainants were credible and their behaviour was consistent with sexual abuse. However, in August 1992, she wrote to the police saying that two of the complainants had undergone "highly leading questioning" from their parents. Her letter was not disclosed to Ellis's defence, and Zelas did not mention any concerns about the two children's credibility at trial.

Psychiatrist and defence expert Keith Le Page said that none of the behaviours described by Zelas were specific to sexual abuse. Le Page said that in his experience, children and adults who had been abused usually expressed distress when recounting their experiences of abuse. The complainants showed little or no distress when describing acts of abuse during their interviews and when later testifying in court. Le Page also testified that children could not remember events experienced at a very young age when there was a long delay between the event and the attempt to recall it. Children could not remember events, even traumatic events, that had occurred at two or three years of age when there was a long delay, he claimed. The alleged abuse at the creche had occurred when children were at these ages.

=== Conviction ===
In June 1993, Ellis was convicted of 16 counts of sexual offences involving seven children. The charges on which he was found guilty were that he had urinated on two children, made one masturbate him, put his penis in the mouths of three of them, engaged in indecent touching of three, and put his penis or an unknown associate's penis against the vagina or anus of three. The following year he was acquitted of three charges involving the oldest complainant, who retracted her allegations and said her original statement was what her mother told her to say.

=== Treatment in prison ===
Corrections officers who sat through the trial with Ellis did not think he was guilty and let that be known at Paparua prison. As a result, Ellis was not subject to any ill-treatment by staff or inmates in prison. Ellis refused to attend parole board hearings while in prison because he would have to confess to the crimes in order to argue for early release.

== Reliability concerns ==
=== Moral panic ===
In the years preceding the first allegation of abuse against Ellis, there had been a number of high profile child abuse cases in Christchurch involving "highly suspect interviews of children", "mistaken mass diagnosis of children" and other "highly questionable claims". The case has also been linked with the day-care sex-abuse hysteria, a moral panic about alleged sexual abuse and Satanic ritual abuse that originated out of California in 1982 and that existed throughout the 1980s. It has also been cited as a major cause in the decline in the number of male teachers in New Zealand schools.

From September 1991 (two months before the first allegation against Ellis), there was "continuous publicity of sexual abuse and ritual abuse of children in the local press or in national media." On 4 September 1991, a Wellington sex abuse counsellor, Anne-Marie Stapp, told the Christchurch daily, The Press, that "New Zealand was fast approaching the level of ritual abuse awareness found in the United States." North and South Magazine reported that it was common knowledge around town that "various Christchurch police officers were hunting for a near mythical pornography-paedophile ring alleged to involve judges, Freemasons and prominent businessmen, though it was never found." On 3 November 1991 the Sunday News quoted the police as saying that "Satanism was rampant in New Zealand and linked to child pornography."

Seventeen days later, a Christchurch mother rang Gaye Davidson, the supervisor at the Civic Creche to make the first complaint about Peter Ellis. When making his appeal to the Supreme Court announced in July 2019, Ellis' former lawyer, Nigel Hampton QC, said he wants the Supreme Court to take the moral panic of the '90s into account in its decision-making.

=== Interview process ===
At least 118 children were interviewed as part of the second investigation into allegations of sexual abuse. Social Welfare psychologist, Sue Sidey, conducted most of the evidential child interviews used at the trial, although she had no formal qualifications in child psychology. In December 1991, Sidey conducted a number of interviews with children which failed to turn up any statements consistent with abuse. Nevertheless, that month, she made a statement that "Peter Ellis is not a suitable person for a child centre" – before any formal allegations of abuse came to light.

However, as more parents became concerned, some children were subsequently interviewed up to six times and began making bizarre allegations. The children's stories "were hardly ever challenged, no matter how fanciful their answers. If the answers were inconsistent or incoherent, then they would be asked again in more elaborate form until an acceptable answer was elicited." Specific questions were employed to elicit allegations that children had apparently made to their parents, contrary to best practice guidelines. The interviewers generally did not check with the children to find out whether their parents had said things to them about Peter Ellis or about the creche to eliminate the possibility of parental contamination. One mother even admitted in court that she encouraged her son to come up with new information by cuddling him, praising him and "telling him how brave he was after he revealed more and more details of his abuse".

Michael Lamb, a leading authority on the interviewing of child abuse victims, was asked to review the interviewing process the children endured. In addition to the problems caused by multiple interviews, he noted that there were substantial delays between the alleged events and the formal interviews which were conducted up to 18 months later. Lamb wrote that during this time, the children were exposed to conversations with their parents, social workers and other children and "were likely to have adopted recently acquired information about the events in question".

Stephen J. Ceci, a psychologist at Cornell University and an expert in children's suggestibility and children's courtroom testimony, also studied transcripts of many of the children's evidential interviews. In July 1995 he said the interviews "were not conducted in accordance with currently understood interviewing principles." According to Ceci, it is impossible to distinguish between accurate and inaccurate allegations when children are suggestively and repeatedly interviewed over a long period.

=== Ellis' sexuality ===
A number of people who were involved in the case believed Ellis was convicted because he was homosexual and was the only male worker at the creche. At the trial, he was portrayed as sexually deviant and perverted, which was held to be somehow consistent with the makeup of a child molester.

=== Accident Compensation Corporation involvement ===
One parent, Malcolm Cox, who had three children at the creche suggested that some parents may have been motivated to make claims that their child had been sexually abused because the Accident Compensation Corporation (ACC) automatically awarded $10,000 to anyone claiming to have been abused. He said that he and his wife were visited by a council social worker with ACC claim forms and told "we had to get in quick to claim the money because lump sums were being abolished".

In the end, ACC paid more than $500,000 to about 40 parents of Civic Creche children. Generally parents received a standard $10,000, "but in cases where Ellis faced multiple charges relating to a single child, some parents claimed for each alleged incident of abuse" (McLoughlin, 1996). One child's parents allegedly claimed five payments, while another claimed four. According to North and South Magazine, "ACC didn't require a conviction before paying out. It paid up without so much as charges being laid in respect of some allegations. The police even wrote letters to ACC supporting compensation claims."

=== Jury ===
A number of irregularities in the trial were publicised in a 20/20 episode which aired on TV3 on 16 November 1997. The programme alleged that the jury foreman had been the celebrant at the wedding of the Crown Prosecutor Brent Stanaway 15 years earlier. It was also alleged that a female juror had had a sexual relationship with a co-worker of the mother of one of the children involved. The programme also put forward statements that most of the children who made allegations of sexual abuse withdrew their accusations at various times during proceedings but that social workers conducting the interviews treated this as a symptom of 'denial'.

=== Detective Colin Eade ===
The 20/20 programme also claimed the main investigating detective, Colin Eade, had a history of mental health problems. Eade told interviewer Melanie Reid he was "burnt out" before the case started and 'beyond repair' by the time it was over. He left the police force in 1994 suffering from posttraumatic stress disorder. In an interview with Sean Plunkett on Radio New Zealand’s Morning Report on 20 November 1997, Eade admitted that after the trial he had sexual relationships with two of the mothers involved in the case and that he had propositioned another mother during the course of the investigation when he was drunk.

New Zealand First MP Rana Waitai, who was a former police commander with 31 years' experience, said "If half of what was on the (20/20) programme is true, Peter Ellis must immediately be released and hugely compensated for the devastation that has been done to his life."

== Appeals ==
=== First Court of Appeal hearing in 1994 ===
The case entered the Court of Appeal in July 1994 led by Graham Panckhurst QC. A key aspect of the appeal was that the seven children, whose evidence the jury accepted, had named 21 other victims – either as observers or participants. None of those 21 children confirmed any of the allegations.

On the fourth day of the hearing (28 July), the oldest child on whose testimony Ellis was convicted, and probably the most credible of the child witnesses, told her parents that her story was not true, that she had said only what she thought her parents and the interviewer wanted to hear. The Court of Appeal considered that it was not uncommon for child complainants to withdraw their allegations. The appellate judges believed the retraction may have been a case of denial on the part of the child and was grounds to overturn only those convictions relating to that child. The child has continued to maintain that she fabricated her allegations and there was no abuse. Her family say they were pressured by the police and crown prosecutor in an unprofessional manner. They also say the Ministry of Justice has never contacted them about their daughter's retraction.

=== Second Court of Appeal hearing in 1999 ===
In November 1998, Ellis presented a second petition to the Governor General seeking a Royal Commission on Inquiry into his case, and either a free pardon or for the whole case to be referred back to the Court of Appeal. The Secretary for Justice sought advice from Sir Thomas Thorp on the second petition. His advice concluded that the terms of reference should be expanded. In 1999 the Ellis case was referred to the Court of Appeal for a second time. Judith Ablett-Kerr, QC, appeared as counsel for Ellis, and Simon France for the Crown. Ablett-Kerr argued emphatically that the children's evidence had been contaminated by parental questioning and presented updated opinions on the dangers of multiple interviews, using anatomically correct dolls and suggestive questioning.

Barry Parsonson, former head of the New Zealand Psychologists Board, was asked to write a report into the process used to interview the children prior to Ellis's second Court of Appeal hearings. Parsonson concluded that "given the conditions prevailing (at the time), the level of parental contamination, and the extremely suggestive interviewing procedures, the probability of the proportion of fact outweighing the proportion of fiction must be very, very small indeed." The Crown presented the expert opinion of Constance Dalenberg. The court concluded that they were not persuaded that a miscarriage of justice had occurred but suggested a Royal Commission of Inquiry could better examine some of the issues raised. Ellis immediately presented a third petition to the Governor General.

=== Petition for mercy ===
In 1999, a retired High Court judge, Sir Thomas Thorp, was commissioned by the Ministry of Justice to examine a petition for the royal prerogative of mercy lodged by Ellis's counsel, Judith Ablett-Kerr QC. She commissioned and supplied reports by experts that were based on selective information, for Thorp to consider. Despite the limitations of the reports, Thorp considered they raised serious concerns that should be investigated further. He wrote that the interview transcripts revealed that on more than one occasion, one child claimed to have seen serious abuse committed against another child, but the second child denied anything happened. Thorp said there was no evidence that the interviewers or the police or did any cross checking before presenting abuse allegations to the jury. He was also concerned that the more bizarre allegations made by children were not put before the jury, arguing that "the jury had to see that the children were capable of outrageous and fanciful allegation".

Thorp stated that the central concerns were "the claims of defective interviewing techniques ... the risk of contamination of the children's evidence... (and) the exclusion of evidence necessary to a proper assessment of the children's reliability". He added that if the opinions of Barry Parsonson, Stephen Ceci and Justice Wood were found to have substantial support, it would "be difficult to argue against the existence of a serious doubt about the safety of the Petitioner's convictions."

=== Eichelbaum inquiry in 2000 ===
In March 2000, Phil Goff, then Minister of Justice, established a ministerial inquiry into the conduct of the interviews, headed by Sir Thomas Eichelbaum. This was undertaken in response to Justice Thorp's report and ongoing concerns over the reliability of the children's evidence. In a later submission, Ministry officials stated that the Ministerial Inquiry was "intended to address specific areas of concern that might not have been seen to have been fully resolved by the Court of Appeal."

The terms of reference required Eichelbaum to examine the relevant documents and seek written submissions from those who were involved in the case but not to interview anyone. He was also required to appoint at least two international experts to provide written reviews of the interviewing techniques that had been used to seek information from the children. He appointed Graham Davies of the University of Leicester and Louise Sas, from London, Ontario, Canada. In his evaluation, Graham Davies wrote he would not "pronounce on the reliability of individual children's accounts." Michael Corballis, psychologist at Auckland University, subsequently questioned the credentials of both these experts asking of Sas, "Can she really be considered an expert?"

Released in March 2001, Eichelbaum's inquiry concluded that the interviews were of good quality overall, and that though excessive questioning by some parents could have led to some contamination, this would not have been sufficient to affect the convictions. Eichelbaum did not say how he determined the children's evidence to be reliable.

=== Petitions for a royal commission ===
In June 2003, two petitions called for a royal commission of inquiry into the case. The first, organised by then National Party leader Don Brash and MP Katherine Rich, had 140 highly prominent signatories. They included two former prime ministers (David Lange and Mike Moore), four former Cabinet ministers, 26 MPs, a retired High Court Judge (Laurence Greig), a retired District Court Judge, 12 law professors, 12 Queen's Counsel, former Auckland police chief Bryan Rowe, historian Michael King, psychology professors, professors from other disciplines, lawyers, child protection workers, psychologists, social workers, therapists and counsellors.

In August 2005, Parliament's justice and electoral select committee reported on the petitions. The committee had several concerns with the way the case was prosecuted. It recommended several changes, although it acknowledged that changes had already been made to the way that children were now interviewed. It also suggested that the testimony of expert prosecution witness Karen Zelas would not be permitted if it were presented now. The committee noted that "The operation of the legal system in respect of this case did not inspire adequate public confidence in the operation of the legal system. A justice system should lead to certainty. In this case it seemed to increase the sense of uncertainty." However, the committee rejected the petitioners' call for a commission of inquiry, concluding that it was not practical to hold such an inquiry.

In December 2007 University of Otago psychologist Harlene Hayne conducted research which compared the standard of interviews conducted in the Ellis case with those of the Kelly Michaels case in the United States. Empirical analysis allowed Hayne to conclude that there was a "strong risk that the evidence of children who told of sexual abuse by Ellis was contaminated by the way the interviews were carried out," and that, contrary to Eichelbaum's conclusions, "the standard of the questions in Ellis was not substantially better than those in Michaels." Francis's articles and Hayne's research were cited in January 2008 by Ellis's counsel when making a renewed request that the Ministry of Justice establish a Royal Commission of Inquiry into the case, but Associate Justice Minister Rick Barker rejected this approach in March 2008. A further call for a Commission of Inquiry was made by former National MPs Katherine Rich and Don Brash and author Lynley Hood in November 2008, and the new Minister of Justice Simon Power said that the government would reconsider the issue. He later declined their request for an inquiry, on the grounds that Ellis still held the right of appeal to the Privy Council and an inquiry therefore could not achieve finality.

In late 2010, Ellis announced his intention to lodge a fourth petition to the Governor General seeking a full pardon.

=== Supreme Court appeal ===
==== Lodging of appeal ====
On 25 July 2019, Ellis, aged 61, lodged an appeal to the Supreme Court. However, by this time he had been diagnosed with terminal bladder cancer and was not expected to live. In August, the Supreme Court said it would consider hearing Ellis' appeal even if he died before the scheduled hearing date in November 2019. Ellis died on 4 September 2019.

Courts in Commonwealth countries, including New Zealand, have traditionally ruled that an individual's interest in any judicial hearing ends if they die. On 1 September 2020 the Supreme Court granted leave for the appeal to be heard despite Ellis's death. The Court said the reasons for their decision would be released along with their ruling on the appeal. Defence lawyer Robert Harrison commented, "I think it's fantastic news...If the Supreme Court has gone down that particular path they're saying there's a value here that deserves to be respected and it means that there is valuing [sic] in continuing the appeal."

==== New allegations ====
A hearing was held in November 2020 regarding allegations of a historic sex offence by Ellis in the early 1980s, and adjourned so that further investigatory work could be done. The complainant allegedly first approached the police in 1992 or 1993, though there is no record of this. The complainant's claims were supported by her sister. The Crown took responsibility for the delays caused by the complaint not previously having been investigated. Ellis's defence lawyer Robert Harrison expressed concern about the new evidence's credibility.

On 26 March 2021 the Supreme Court heard the application for the woman's evidence to be used in the appeal. In her statement, the woman claimed Ellis molested her while babysitting her in 1983, in a manner similar to the alleged crimes against the Civic Creche children. She allegedly recognised the man who molested her as Ellis from a 2007 documentary about his case.

Defence lawyer Rob Harrison told the court that the women's evidence was not relevant to the appeal, and if the evidence was admitted it would expand the scope of the appeal to challenge its reliability, through ACC and other records. He said there was no corroborating evidence and it was unfair to admit her statement now given Ellis could no longer respond to it. He also said the woman's statement was inconsistent with earlier statements she had given, suggesting her memory was "evolving". Crown lawyer John Billington admitted there were inconsistencies in the woman's statement and no corroborating evidence to support it. Nonetheless, he said the court must decide if the evidence was helpful in deciding the case.

On 16 June 2021 the Court dismissed the application for the women's evidence to be used in the appeal, concluding it was inadmissible.

==== October 2021 hearing ====
The appeal hearing began on 4 October 2021. The Supreme Court took the unusual step of hearing new evidence. Experts from both sides, some from Australia and the US, gave evidence in a panel setting by video link. Counsel for Ellis, Rob Harrison, said the appeal would focus on four issues: the questioning and risk of contamination of the children's testimony; that the jury was inappropriately assisted by the expert testimony of the period; that an expert witness's claims of symptoms exhibited by children being linked to abuse were without scientific foundation; and that the trial was inconsistent with the New Zealand Bill of Rights Act and unfair due to sanitisation of charges.

The experts for Ellis' case were memory researcher Harlene Hayne, vice-chancellor of Curtin University, Perth, Australia (and former vice-chancellor of the University of Otago), University of Otago clinical psychologist and memory scientist Deirdre Brown, New Zealand clinical psychologist Tess Patterson, and memory expert Mark Howe from Canada. The Crown experts were Gail Goodman, a memory researcher from the University of California, Frederick Seymour, the former head of the clinical psychology programme at Auckland University, and Auckland clinical psychologist Suzanne Blackwell, who often gave evidence in court about the reliability of sexual abuse accounts.

The experts were in fair agreement that young children can recall distinctive and stressful events with a high degree of accuracy, even after long delays, if they are interviewed appropriately and not exposed to additional incorrect information. However, the interview techniques, expert evidence at Ellis' trial and evidence of contamination of the children’s memories came under intense scrutiny. Hayne and Brown argued the climate of accusation at the time, suggestive parental questioning of the children prior to formal interview, children exposed to unwarranted sources of information, interviewers' lack of impartiality and their use of suggestive questions were grounds for doubt. Hayne also said that even the Crown experts agree with her that the children's interviews were below the standard of best practice, even for the time. She also said "Goodman and I are in large agreement on these contamination opportunities. Goodman rated child 3 as having moderate risk and child 4, 5, 6 and 7 as extreme."

Crown expert Gail Goodman conceded that the contamination of the children's accounts and the long delay between the time of the events and their recounting made it impossible to know what had happened. Seymour and Blackwell also agreed there were opportunities for contamination and the interviewing approach may have been sub-optimal in some respects. However, in a combined statement, the psychologists said that "while it may be the case that children were impacted by parents' cross-talk and interaction, there is no evidence available to show that this is the case".

Goodman also said, "Research at the time showed re-enactment increased very young children's recall. Interview techniques using props can illicit [sic] more answers than verbal questioning alone." She further claimed many of the interviews were doing their best and often began with neutral questions such as "what have you come here to talk to me about today?" before letting the children lead.

The use of dolls in the interviews came under criticism and debate. Ellis' lawyer Rob Harrison argued the use of books and dolls depicting sexual abuse was one of the contamination factors in the case. In response, Seymour for the Crown claimed the use of props such as dolls in the interviews was mostly used when children had already disclosed sexual abuse. The dolls were just for clarity: "These targeted interactions took place after the substantial abuse report had already been made by the child. The presentation of these dolls was in keeping with protocol of time following the child already giving a credible description of abuse." Goodman added, "Research at the time showed re-enactment increased very young children's recall. Interview techniques using props can illicit more answers than verbal questioning alone."

Karen Zelas, Crown psychiatrist at the 1993 trial, came under intense criticism. At the trial Zelas identified behavioural symptoms shown by the complainant creche children that were "consistent" with child sexual abuse. She had prepared a detailed chart for the trial, which showed the myriad symptoms displayed by each of the complainant children that she said were consistent with sexual abuse, and essentially claimed it was more likely a child had been abused if they exhibited a cluster of some of the 20 or so behavioural symptoms she catalogued. However, Tess Patterson said that even in 1993, there was no evidence of behaviours specific to child abuse and certainly no clusters, and criticised Zelas for not sufficiently considering that troubling behaviours could be due to other factors. Zelas was further criticised for writing a long letter to the police in August 1992 expressing serious concerns about leading parental questioning and intense interrogation before some of the children's interviews, but during cross-examination she failed to repeat "for the court the very serious concerns she had expressed in her letter" to the police.

In final submissions on 12 October 2021, Ellis' counsel Rob Harrison said an "abundance" of evidence was available that showed the complainant children had taken on information from a variety of sources before their formal interviews and either regurgitated that information or used it to create accounts. As an example of how a child could be "readied" to give false accounts, Harrison highlighted a letter from August 1992 from the mother of a complainant child (Child 5) about how an evidential interview with her child had been cancelled because of her questioning. In the letter the mother also claimed the child told her about another two Christchurch creches being involved in sexual abuse and other workers at the Civic creche being sexual offenders. The two creches were never investigated, and Harrison asked the Supreme Court why this was the case if the police were confident Child 5's evidence was not contaminated. He also asked why the police never charged Ellis with multiple counts of sodomy based on what Child 5 claimed in his fifth and sixth interviews. The letter also mentioned that the counsellor with whom the child was in therapy wanted Satanic ritual abuse expert Pamela Hudson to come to New Zealand to assist in the case.

Bridget Irvine, counsel for Ellis, said in further submissions that the interviews of the children were below best practice, pointing out that the children being subjected to a high level of suggestive questions (for example, 46 abuse-related questions in the case of Child 1) before making their first allegations against Ellis. Ellis' counsel Sue Gray claimed the evidence of psychiatrist Karen Zelas about clusters of behaviour that she claimed were consistent with child sexual abuse were scientifically unsound, and she also spoke to the sexual knowledge of the complainants, which was not permitted.

In the final submissions from the Crown on 13 October 2021, Crown counsel John Billington claimed the jury verdicts were safe. Although the Crown conceded the interviewing of the children would be done differently today, they claimed the interviews were best practice of the time and demonstrated most of the elements of good evidential interviewing. The way evidence was obtained from the children was not "so egregious, so ill-informed that it starts to get into the category of blood tests versus DNA". Hayne's data showing the number of suggestive questions children were asked before their formal interviews were "a nonsense". He said the parents were not the hysterical types contended by the defence and the sometimes bizarre accounts of the children could have been due to the natural tendency of children to exaggerate. A Crown expert had said fantastical claims could be "part and parcel" of being an abused child. Billington further claimed the jury was able to discriminate between contamination and lack of it in the children's accounts, and their verdicts reflected this.

On 14 October 2021, the judges discussed a letter with counsel regarding the letter written by Crown expert Karen Zelas in August 1992 to the police, which was not available at the trial. Zelas' letter raised serious concerns about the potential contamination of accounts given by a child in his evidential interviews because of intense questioning from his parents and siblings, leading to cancellation of a scheduled interview with the child. But Zelas did not mention this when she gave evidence regarding the veracity of the child's accounts. The defence said the omission of this piece of evidence about the letter misled the jury and helped to render its verdicts unsafe. The judges called the letter a real "gotcha" and "cross-examination gold". Crown counsel John Billington argued that Zelas had given admissible evidence and if she had been cross-examined on the letter, she might have endorsed the interviews that took place prior to the cancelled one. He further claimed that although Zelas' cluster evidence could be said to be wrong science, it was not so factually and scientifically flawed to undermine the verdicts.

=== Supreme Court decision ===
On 7 October 2022, the Supreme Court allowed the appeal and quashed Ellis' convictions. The Court unanimously found that there were problems with Karen Zelas' evidence, and that the jury had not been fairly informed of the risk of contamination of the children's evidence (for example through repeated parental questioning). The Court said its decision should not be taken "as a criticism of the parents, the complainants or those involved in the investigation and trial". This was the first time in New Zealand history that a conviction had been overturned posthumously.

During the appeal, Ellis' lawyers, including Natalie Coates, had argued that the Court should overturn Ellis' conviction on the basis of Tikanga Māori (the customary rules which govern Māori life), arguing it gave him the right to clear his name and restore his mana (prestige) posthumously. Coates later said: "although tikanga had not been the deciding factor in the [Court's] decision, it had affirmed its relevance in the legal framework".

The Supreme Court's decision was welcomed by Ellis' family and supporters as a vindication of twenty-eight years of efforts to clear his name. By contrast, the parents of some of the alleged victims issued a statement expressing shock and sadness that the Court had allegedly favoured a convicted criminal and ignored the victims by quashing his convictions.

== Prominent support ==
=== Lynley Hood's A City Possessed ===
In 2001 Lynley Hood published a 616 page book about the case and the moral panic of sexual abuse within New Zealand at that time. In 2002 A City Possessed won the top prize for non-fiction and for readers' choice in the New Zealand Book Awards. As Hood tells it, fear and anxiety about ritual abuse began in childcare facilities overseas in the early 1980s. Given the number of sex abuse scenarios in Christchurch in the 1980s such as "the Glenelg Health Camp, Ward 24, and the Great Child Pornography fiascos – it was probable that some sort of panic would break out in Christchurch." Hood argued that the professional careers of experts benefited from the case while more than 100 children were subjected to unpleasant, repetitive and psychologically dangerous procedures for no good reason.

A former National Party leader, Don Brash, was drawn to the controversy after reading Hood’s book. He commented: "I was stunned at how compelling a case it made. The Peter Ellis case is a serious miscarriage of justice and I am utterly astonished [his conviction] hasn't been overturned. It is implausible to believe four women and one man could do this in a busy creche". In 2006, Brash cited the case when supporting calls for an independent body investigating miscarriages of justice in New Zealand. On 17 December 2014, Brash and author Lynley Hood again called for a review of the case by way of an independent inquiry led by an authority from outside New Zealand. The appeal was made to Amy Adams, the newly appointed Minister of Justice for the National Party-led government returned in the 2014 General Election.

=== Journalists ===
According to Greg Newbold, senior lecturer in sociology at the University of Canterbury, even cynical journalists like Frank Haden, David McLoughlin, Melanie Reid, George Balani, and Martin van Beynen – the only journalist to have sat right through the trial – agree that Ellis is not guilty. Newbold notes that "it was a politician who saved Arthur Allan Thomas, but the Ellis case is different from Thomas's, because Ellis lacks government support." In 2000 (after Ellis' failed appeals) he wrote: "at the moment the judiciary is turning away from the plight of a man impugned by some of the most absurd testimony ever heard in a New Zealand court."

=== New Zealand Law Journal ===
In late 2007 and January 2008, three articles on the Ellis case were published in The New Zealand Law Journal. These included two articles by researcher Ross Francis. Francis concluded that despite two appeal hearings, three applications for a pardon, a ministerial inquiry, and a parliamentary inquiry, questions about the reliability of Ellis' convictions remain. He wrote: "Whilst it may appear that the case has been examined thoroughly, the facts show otherwise. The Court of Appeal did not review all the available evidence and, at the second hearing, failed to give any weight to the expert opinions." The journal review prompted Sir Thomas Thorp to comment that the articles "must add to concerns expressed previously that that case may have gone awry".

== See also ==
- Orkney child abuse scandal

== Bibliography ==
- Bander, Joy, A Mother's Story: The Civic Creche Child Sex Trial, Howling at the Moon Productions, 1997. ISBN 0-9583717-0-9
- Brett, Cate (September 1993). "Beyond the Civic creche case". North & South. pp. 54–70. Archived from the original on 27 February 2018.
- Sir Thomas Eichelbaum's Report into the Peter Ellis Case
- Francis, Ross (November 2007a). "New evidence in the Peter Ellis case" (PDF). New Zealand Law Journal: 399–404. Archived from the original (PDF) on 30 May 2008.
- Francis, Ross (December 2007b). "New evidence in the Ellis case – II" (PDF). New Zealand Law Journal: 399–439. Archived from the original (PDF) on 30 May 2008.
- Francis, Ross (September 2009). "Peter Ellis: The Case for a Commission of Inquiry" (PDF). Peter Ellis. Archived from the original (PDF) on 9 August 2019.
- Hood, Lynley (October 2001). A City Possessed: The Christchurch Civic Creche Case. Dunedin: Longacre Press. ISBN 1-877135-62-3.
- Justice and Electoral Committee Report (pdf)
- Lanning, K. (1991). "Ritual abuse: A law enforcement view or perspective". Child Abuse and Neglect. 15 (3): 171–173. doi:10.1016/0145-2134(91)90061-H. PMID 2043968.
- London, Kamala; Maggie Bruck; Stephen J. Ceci; Daniel W. Shuman (2005). "Disclosure of Child Sexual Abuse: What Does the Research Tell Us About the Ways That Children Tell?" (PDF). Psychology, Public Policy, and Law. 11 (1): 194–226. doi:10.1037/1076-8971.11.1.194.
- McLoughlin, David (August 1996). "Second Thoughts on the Christchurch Civic Creche case: Has justice failed Peter Ellis?". North & South. pp. 54–69. Archived from the original on 6 August 2019.
- Smart, R. (1992). "A review of the management policy and practices of the Civic Childcare Centre".
- Thorp Report, Sir Thomas Thorp, Auckland, March 1999
- Transcripts of evidential interviews of (selected) complainant children, R v Ellis 1993 Peter Ellis Toddler Testimonies
