= Oak Hill satanic ritual abuse trial =

1991 court case in Texas

The Oak Hill satanic ritual abuse trial occurred in Oak Hill, Austin, Texas, in 1991 when Fran Keller and her husband Dan, proprietors of a small day care, were accused of repeatedly and sadistically abusing several children.

The Kellers were convicted of multiple charges and sentenced to 48 years in prison, but were freed in 2013 based on newly revealed information about misconduct by the prosecution and other authorities. The charges against them were dismissed in 2017, and the Kellers were declared "actually innocent", entitling them to compensation.

== Overview ==
In the summer of 1991, the therapist of a three-year-old child being treated for behavioural problems due to her parents' divorce alleged that the Kellers had sexually abused the child. The child's mother contacted the police, who alerted the case's eventual prosecuting attorney, who contacted a friend whose child was also enrolled in the day care and being treated by the same therapist. During the time leading up to the trial, two other children from the day care put similar accusations. According to the children, the couple served blood-laced Kool-Aid and forced them to have videotaped sex with adults and other children. The Kellers, they said, sometimes wore white robes and lit candles before hurting them. The children also accused the Kellers of forcing them to watch or participate in the killing and dismemberment of cats, dogs and a crying baby. Bodies were allegedly unearthed in cemeteries and new holes dug to hide freshly killed animals and, once, an adult passer-by was shot and dismembered with a chainsaw. The children recalled several plane trips, including one to Mexico, where they were sexually abused by soldiers before returning to Austin in time to meet their parents at the day care.

An adult, who had recently claimed to have recovered memories of childhood ritual abuse, claimed the abuse was an example of satanic ritual abuse, and parents began to contact each other, eventually launching a legal case. With information gathered from Believe the Children, an organization created by the parents involved in the earlier McMartin preschool trial, children enrolled in the Kellers' daycare were repeatedly questioned by parents, therapists and law enforcement officers as part of the investigation.

Suspicion expanded to include public officials, including police officers; one officer's ex-husband was interrogated for several hours and submitted to two polygraph tests, eventually confessing child (but not ritual) abuse, although he retracted the confession the following morning. Following this confession, the Kellers fled the state, later explaining that their decision was based on the draconian sentences imposed on other, similarly accused day care providers. The children were diagnosed with dissociative identity disorder.

The Kellers faced a six-day trial. The first child, whose testimony began the investigation against the Kellers, said that no abuse had actually taken place, but that she had been coached to claim that abuse had occurred. The only physical evidence of abuse in the case was presented by Michael Mouw, an emergency room physician at Brackenridge Hospital who examined the 3-year-old girl in 1991 on the night she first accused Dan Keller of abuse. Mouw testified at the Kellers' trial that he found two tears in the girl's hymen consistent with sexual abuse and determined that the injuries were less than 24 hours old. Three years after the trial, while attending a medical seminar, Mouw said a slide presentation on "normal" pediatric hymens included a photo that was identical to what he had observed in the girl. In 2013, at a new trial, Mouw said under oath in no uncertain terms: “I was mistaken.”

The Kellers were found guilty and given sentences of 48 years each.

Fran Keller went to a prison near Marlin, Texas, while Dan Keller went to a prison near Amarillo, Texas.

== Reevaluation ==
Later investigation of the case revealed serious problems: there was no physical evidence of abuse, a retracted confession that the investigating officer did not believe, flawed medical exams of the children, testimony by a dubious "expert" on satanic ritual abuse, and the prosecution withholding information from the defense. More generally, there has been more understanding since 1991 of the unreliability of child testimony and that young children are easily suggestible, meaning an unethical or simply incompetent interrogator can easily get wild and false claims from children.

On November 26, 2013, the Travis County district attorney's office announced that Fran Keller, now 63, was being released on bond and her husband, Dan Keller, who was convicted at the same time, would be released within a week in a deal reached with lawyers. "There is a reasonable likelihood that (the medical expert's) false testimony affected the judgment of the jury and violated Frances Keller's right to a fair trial," said the district attorney.

On June 20, 2017, the Travis County district attorney's office announced that the case against the Kellers had been dismissed, citing actual innocence. This ruling made them eligible for compensation from the state of Texas for the 21 years they spent in prison. In August 2017 they were awarded $3.4 million in compensation for the wrongful conviction.
