= Wee Care Nursery School abuse trial =

Legal case in New Jersey, United States

Wee Care Nursery School, located in Maplewood, New Jersey, was the subject of a day care child abuse case that was tried during the 1980s. Although Margaret Kelly Michaels was prosecuted and convicted, the decision was reversed after she spent five years in prison. An appellate court ruled that several features of the original trial had produced an unjust ruling and the conviction was reversed. The case was studied by several psychologists who were concerned about the interrogation methods used and the quality of the children's testimony in the case. This resulted in research concerning the topic of children's memory and suggestibility, resulting in new recommendations for performing interviews with child victims and witnesses. The case was part of the broader day-care sex-abuse hysteria, a moral panic that occurred primarily during the 1980s and early 1990s.

== Accusation ==
In April 1985, a nurse took the temperature of a 4-year-old boy with a rectal thermometer and the boy said, "That's what my teacher does to me at nap time at school." The comment was reported to the local authorities, and all the children at the Wee Care Nursery School were questioned. Social workers and therapists collected testimony from 51 children from the day care center. During the interviews, children made accusations such as that Michaels forced them to lick peanut butter off of her genitals, that she penetrated their rectums and vaginas with knives, forks and other objects, that she forced them to eat cakes made from human excrement and that she made them play duck, duck, goose while naked. Michaels was indicted for 235 counts of sexual offenses with children and youths. She denied the charges.

Upon conviction, when asked whether they actually believed some of the more sordid claims from the children, prosecutors Glenn Goldberg and Sara McArdle answered "No" and "Oh, absolutely" simultaneously. But when journalist Dorothy Rabinowitz asked about some of these bizarre elements, such as knives that left no scars, Goldberg replied, "What is there left to know? The jury has spoken. She's convicted."

== Trial ==
The trial began on June 22, 1987. The prosecution produced expert witnesses who said that "almost all the children displayed symptoms of sexual abuse." Prosecution witnesses testified that the children had "regressed into such behavior as bed-wetting and defecating in their clothing." The witnesses also said that the children became afraid of being left alone or of staying in the dark. They also testified that the children had exhibited knowledge of "sexual behavior far beyond their years." Some of the other teachers testified against her. The defense argued that Michaels had not had the opportunity to take the children to a location where all of the alleged activities could have taken place without being noticed. The jury was not shown the transcripts of the interrogations of the children that produced the accusations.

After nine months, the case went to the jury for deliberation. At that time, 131 counts remained, including charges of aggravated sexual assault, sexual assault, endangering the welfare of children, and making terroristic threats. The jury deliberated for 12 days before Michaels was convicted of 115 counts of sexual offenses involving 20 children.

On August 2, 1988, Michaels was sentenced to 47 years in prison, with no possibility for parole for the first 14 years. The judge "said the facts in the case were sordid, bizarre and demeaning to the children." Michaels told the judge that she was "confident her conviction would be overturned on appeal."

== Release ==
In March 1993, after five years in prison, Michaels' appeal was successful and she was released. The New Jersey Supreme Court overturned the lower court's decision and declared that the interviews of the children were "highly improper" and utilized "coercive and unduly suggestive methods."

A three-judge panel ruled she had been denied a fair trial because the prosecution of the case had "relied on testimony that should have been excluded", because it "improperly used" an expert's theory, called the child sexual abuse accommodation syndrome, to establish guilt. In June 1993, the State Supreme Court refused to hear the prosecutor's appeal of the decision. In February 1994, "the court heard arguments...about the admissibility of evidence."

In December 1994, the prosecution dropped the attempt to retry the case because "too many obstacles" had been placed in the way of a successful retrial. The major hurdle was that "if the state decided to reprosecute Michaels, it must produce 'clear and convincing evidence' that the statements and testimony elicited by the improper interview techniques are reliable enough to warrant admission." "While the Supreme Court stopped short of instructing the prosecutor to drop the case, the court made it clear that it believed the children's testimony would not hold up."

== Interrogation methods ==
During Michaels’ appeal, researchers Maggie Bruck and Stephen Ceci prepared an amicus brief regarding the case that pointed out several problems with the children's testimony that was the primary evidence. Some of the issues that were addressed were the role of interviewer bias, repeated questions, peer pressure, and the use of anatomically correct dolls in contaminating the children's testimony. These interview techniques could have led to memory errors or false memories. In addition to the problems with the interviews themselves, the fact that there were no recordings of initial interviews meant that important evidence was missing; therefore, it was not possible to determine the origin of some of the information that children reported (i.e., it could have been suggested to them by interviewers in the early interviews.)

Interviews from the Wee Care Nursery School and McMartin preschool trials were examined as part of a research project on the testimony of children questioned in a highly suggestive manner. Compared with a set of interviews from Child Protective Services, the interviews from the two trials were "significantly more likely to (a) introduce new suggestive information into the interview, (b) provide praise, promises, and positive reinforcement, (c) express disapproval, disbelief, or disagreement with children, (d) exert conformity pressure, and (e) invite children to pretend or speculate about supposed events."

== See also ==
- List of wrongful convictions in the United States
