= Child sexual abuse accommodation syndrome =

Unrecognized syndrome related to child sexual abuse

Child sexual abuse accommodation syndrome (CSAAS) is a syndrome proposed by Roland C. Summit in 1983 to describe how he believed sexually abused children responded to ongoing sexual abuse. He said children "learn to accept the situation and to survive. There is no way out, no place to run. The healthy, normal emotionally resilient child will learn to accommodate to the reality of continuing sexual abuse."

Summit described how he claimed that children try to resolve the experience of sexual abuse in relation to the effects of disclosure in real life. He posited five stages:

1. Secrecy
2. Helplessness
3. Entrapment and accommodation
4. Delayed disclosure
5. Retraction

Summit himself recognized in later articles the extent to which many persons were misled by the use of the term "syndrome" and how his theory had been used inappropriately as a diagnostic method for both behavioural sciences and criminal trials.

According to Mary de Young, CSAAS was invoked often during the day-care sex-abuse hysteria of the 1980s and 1990s, because it purports to explain both delayed disclosures and withdrawals of false allegation of child sexual abuse. De Young argued that CSAAS is used to justify any statement made by a child as an indication that sexual abuse had occurred, because immediate disclosure could be an indication of abuse, but also delayed disclosure, withdrawal and sustained denial.

Several states have prohibited testimony regarding CSAAS, based on evidence that it is not accepted generally by scientists, except for delayed reporting. Neither the American Psychiatric Association nor the American Psychological Association has recognized CSAAS.
