= Outreau case =

2004 French child sexual abuse trial

- Location: Outreau, Nord-Pas-de-Calais, France
- Date: between 1997 and 2000
- Attack type: Child sexual abuse
- Victims: 12 children

The Outreau case refers to a criminal case of pedophilia which took place between 1997 and 2000 in Outreau (a French commune) in northern France and a partial judicial error which led to provisional detentions between 2001 and 2004. Following alerts launched by social services within the Delay family, a long investigation seemed to reveal an extensive pedophile network: around forty adults had been accused and around fifty children were potentially victims.

The trial took place in May–July 2004 before the Cour d'assises, a criminal trial court, of the commune Pas-de-Calais (Saint-Omer) where 12 children were recognised victims of rape, sexual assault, corruption of minors and pimping. 10 of the 17 accused adults were sentenced to prison. The appeal trial at the Paris Court of Appeal took place in November 2005, where six of the ten accused were acquitted; the other four had not appealed. The case thus resulted in four final convictions of the two couples, as well as the acquittal of thirteen of the seventeen accused (some of whom were parents of children recognised as victims), several of whom had been held in prison for one to three years.

The acquitted received apologies from President Jacques Chirac and were compensated for their imprisonment. One of the accused, François Mourmand, who had been accused of having murdered a child, died after 17 months in pre-trial detention. A parliamentary commission of inquiry took place in 2005 to analyse the causes of the dysfunctions of justice in the case.

The theme of the case, the high number of children recognized as victims, the potential murder of a child, as well as the number of adults indicted and kept in pre-trial detention made this case a national headline and gave rise to strong public criticism. The particularities of the trials of the Outreau affair made it a sensitive and controversial subject, while the words of the child victims have been misrepresented and not all those acquitted would be innocent. The Outreau affair caused distrust among young victims in France, with a 40% drop in child sexual assault convictions in the decade following the acquittal on appeal.

== Outreau case ==
The "Outreau case", which concerned an alleged criminal network in Outreau, a working class town next to Boulogne-sur-Mer in the Pas-de-Calais region, began in November 2001. The first trial took place in Saint-Omer in 2004, and the appeal took place in Paris in 2005.

Seventeen people were prosecuted, but more than fifty people were investigated. Mostly parents, they were charged with child sexual abuse and incest and their children were separated from them for much of this time. The affair began when some school teachers and social workers noticed "strange sexual behavior" from four children of the Delay-Badaoui family. Psychologists believed the children to be credible witnesses, and later an administrative report showed that doctors found evidence of sexual abuse on five children. The parents were accused on the testimony of some of the children, which was then backed up by the confessions of some of the accused. During his incarceration, Daniel Legrand, the youngest of the accused, declared having witnessed the murder of a little girl. He sent a letter to the judge and also to the newspaper France 3, giving the investigation a national dimension. The information was cross-referenced with other testimonies but the child's body was never found.

The defendants were held in custody for from one to three years. In the first trial (in 2004), four of the eighteen admitted guilt and were convicted, while seven denied involvement and were acquitted. Six further defendants denied the charges but were convicted and given light sentences – they appealed their convictions, and were heard by the Paris Cour d'assises in autumn 2005. On the first day of the hearing, the prosecution's claims were destroyed, and all six were acquitted. Another defendant died in prison while awaiting trial.

== Judicial process ==
=== First trial ===
The trial took place before Saint-Omer's Cour d'assises, composed of three professional judges and nine jurors.

The case involved an alleged ring of 17 persons, with the charges based on one woman's evidence and some corroborating statements from alleged victims. The alleged offenders were condemned on the grounds of certain adults' and, most of all, the children's testimony, together with psychiatric evidence. The children's testimony took place in "huis clos" (behind closed doors); such a procedure is normal in France for victims of sexual abuse, especially minors.

The six convicted persons who denied any responsibility appealed their convictions.

The woman who had given much of the evidence later confessed in court she had lied, and the children's revelations were found to be unreliable. Only four of the accused ever confessed, all the others insisted on their innocence: one died in jail during the investigation, seven others were acquitted during the first trial in May 2004, the last six during the second trial on the evening of 1 December 2005.

=== Second trial ===
The appeal took place before Paris' Cour d'assises, composed of three professional judges and twelve jurors, used as an appellate court for review of both facts and law.

On its first day, the prosecution's claims were dismissed, owing to the statement of the main prosecution witness, Myriam Badaoui, who had declared on 18 November that the six convicted persons "had not done anything" and that she had herself lied. Thierry Delay, her former husband, backed up her statement. During the trial, the psychological evidence was also called into question, as it appeared biased and lacking in weight. The denials of two children, who admitted that they had formerly lied, also contributed to the destruction of the prosecution's claims. One of the psychologists said on TV: "I am paid the same as a cleaning lady, so I provide a cleaning lady's expertise," which caused further public indignation.

At the end of the trial, the prosecutor (avocat général) asked for the acquittal of all of the accused persons. The defence renounced its right to plead, preferring to observe a minute of silence in favour of François Mourmand, who had died in prison during remand. Yves Bot, general prosecutor of Paris, came to the trial on its last day, without previously notifying the president of the Cour d'assises, Mrs. Mondineu-Hederer; while there, Bot presented his apologies to the defendants on behalf of the legal system—he did this before the verdict was delivered, taking for granted a "not guilty" ruling, for which some magistrates reproached him afterwards.

All six defendants were finally acquitted on 1 December 2005, putting an end to five years of trials, which have been described by the French media as a "judicial foundering" or even as a "judicial Chernobyl".

=== Remaining sentences ===
Four people remained convicted after the appeal trial: Thierry Delay, Myriam Badaoui (who had not appealed her conviction), and a neighbouring couple. Thierry Delay, his wife, and one of the neighbours confessed that they had wrongfully accused other people to have been involved in the abuse cases, whereas only the four of them had been involved.

Thierry Delay was convicted and sentenced to 20 years in prison. Myriam Badaoui received 15 years and was freed in 2015.

== Aftermath ==
=== Questioning on French justice and media involvement ===
The affair caused public indignation and questions about the general workings of justice in France. The role of an inexperienced magistrate, Fabrice Burgaud, fresh out of the Ecole Nationale de la Magistrature was underscored, as well as the undue weight given to children's words and to psychiatric expertise, both of which were revealed to have been wrong.

The media's relation of the events was also questioned; although they were quick to point out the judicial error, they also had previously endorsed the "Outreau affair".

=== IGAS report on children's medical records ===
In 2007 the existence of a confidential IGAS (General Inspectorate of Health and Social Affairs) report was announced by Le Point newspaper, in which it emerged that for five of the 17 children in the case, whose parents were acquitted, signs suggestive of sexual abuse had been identified. The report also allegedly denied any wrongdoing from the social services. The report was never published or proved.

=== Parliamentary inquiry ===
After the second trial, the Prime Minister Dominique de Villepin, the minister of justice Pascal Clément and President Chirac himself officially apologised to the victims in the name of the government and of the judicial institutions.

In January 2006, there was a special parliamentary enquiry (for the first time broadcast live on television) about this catastrophe judiciaire (judicial disaster), which had been called by President Chirac in order to help prevent a recurrence of this situation through alterations in France's legal system. The role of experts (who had drawn hasty conclusions from children's testimony) and child protection advocates, lack of legal representation, the responsibility of the judges (the prosecution's case depended in this instance on a single investigative magistrate) and the role of the mass media were examined.

The acquitted persons' hearing by the parliamentary enquiry caused a surge of emotion through the whole country. The affair was designated a "judiciary shipwreck".

=== Fabrice Burgaud ===
On 24 April 2009 the Conseil supérieur de la magistrature, held by upper French magistrates, sentenced Burgaud to a reprimand (réprimande avec inscription au dossier), the lowest disciplinary penalty in the French judiciary system. Fabrice Burgaud was heard in 2015 during a third trial and denied again any wrongdoing.

== Subsequent convictions ==
On February 23, 2012, the criminal court of Boulogne-sur-Mer sentenced Franck and Sandrine Lavier, two acquitted from Outreau, to ten and eight months in prison respectively, suspended for habitual violence (not of a sexual nature) against two of their children. In November 2023 Franck Lavier was sentenced to six months in prison for sexual assault on his daughter.

== Film and media ==
In 2011 a film, Présumé coupable (English title: Presumed Guilty) was released, a drama documentary about the case from the viewpoint of Alain Marecaux, one of the acquitted defendants (even though accused of sex offense by his son François-Xavier Marécaux), based on his memoirs.

In 2012 another film Outreau, l'autre vérité (English title: Outreau, the other truth) was released. It is a documentary about the case from the viewpoint of some of the children, the experts and the magistrates. It paints a picture of how the press was manipulated by the defence lawyers, and how the words of the children were stifled.

In 2023, a mixed fiction-documental TV series was released on the French public channel France 2.

In 2024 Netflix released a documentary TV series on the case, The Outreau Case: A French Nightmare.

== Child victims' viewpoint ==
With the 2023 release of a television series about the case on France 2, one of the victims, a child of the main family of the case, Jonathan Delay, called for a boycott. He alleged that the series constituted "media manipulation", by presenting "adults as being the first victims of this affair". The series does not show that certain children, including Jonathan Delay, remain convinced that some of the acquitted were in fact guilty.

During the hearing, the behaviour of Éric Dupond-Moretti, lawyer for the Outreau acquitted, and later French Justice minister, is also called into question. According to a rumour that reappeared during the France 2 series, he terrorized a 7-year-old girl who, out of fear, urinated on herself. Éric Maurel, at the time prosecutor of Saint-Omer, says in front of the General Inspectorate of Judicial Services that he believes that during the trial the victims "were mishandled", that "the children were harassed by questions from the various defense lawyers. There was tension and very strong verbal violence, organised and part of a defense strategy, including between defense lawyers, despite the president's attempts to restore calm. He mentions "the case of a child of around ten years old who was heard for several hours in the civil parties' box".

== See also ==
- Angers pedophile network, a case in the late 90s where 62 adults were convicted and 45 children recognized victims of rapes and pimping.
- Outreau, the other truth, a documentary about the Outreau case, from the viewpoint of some of the victim children.
- McMartin preschool trial, a Californian case where several adults accused of sexual abuse remained on remand for years before charges were dropped.
- Orkney child abuse scandal, a Scottish child abuse prosecution that collapsed on its first day of trial.
- Martensville satanic sex scandal
- Satanic panic
