= Thomas Eichelbaum =

New Zealand judge

The Right Honourable Sir Thomas Eichelbaum GBE QC

11th Chief Justice of New Zealand
- In office 1989 – 17 May 1999
- Nominated by: David Lange
- Appointed by: Sir Paul Reeves
- Preceded by: Sir Ronald Davison
- Succeeded by: Dame Sian Elias

Personal details
- Born: 17 May 1931 Königsberg, Germany
- Died: 31 October 2018 (aged 87) Wellington, New Zealand
- Spouse: Vida Beryl Franz (m. 1956; died 2013)

Sir Johann Thomas Eichelbaum GBE PC QC (17 May 1931 – 31 October 2018) was a New Zealand jurist who served as the 11th chief justice of New Zealand.

== Early life and family ==
Eichelbaum was born in Königsberg, Germany, and his family emigrated to Wellington, New Zealand, in 1938 to escape the persecution of Jews. He became a naturalised New Zealander in 1946. Eichelbaum was educated at Hutt Valley High School, then attended Victoria University College, graduating LLB in 1954. In 1956, Eichelbaum married Vida Beryl Franz, and the couple went on to have three sons.

Eichelbaum's father Walter was first cousin with Siegfried Eichelbaum, the husband of the artist Vera Chapman.

== Legal career ==
In 1978, Eichelbaum was appointed a Queen's Counsel, and from 1980 to 1982 he was President of the New Zealand Law Society. In 1982, Eichelbaum was appointed a judge of the High Court of New Zealand. The highest judicial position Eichelbaum held was in 1989 when he was appointed the chief justice of New Zealand; he retired from the Bench in 1999.

== Retirement ==
Following his retirement from the bench, Eichelbaum conducted investigations on a number of controversial topics. He chaired the 2000–2001 Report of the Royal Commission on Genetic Modification. He also investigated the reasons for New Zealand losing co-hosting rights to the 2003 Rugby World Cup. Following his report, the chairman and the CEO of the New Zealand Rugby Union both resigned.

In 2001, he conducted a ministerial inquiry reviewing children's evidence in the controversial Peter Ellis case. His report, which has been widely criticised, upheld the guilty verdicts and stands in contrast to an earlier report by retired High Court judge, Sir Thomas Thorp. A New Zealand Law Journal editorial has stated that Eichelbaum had either not read all the children's statements (reviewing only those allowed by the trial judge) or that, "with respect, his judgment is at fault." On 7 October 2022 The Supreme Court of New Zealand quashed all of Peter Ellis' convictions for child sexual abuse.

On 6 February 1989, Eichelbaum was appointed a Knight Grand Cross of the Order of British Empire in the 1989 Special Honours, and later that same year was appointed to the Privy Council. Eichelbaum was a non-permanent judge of the Hong Kong SAR Court of Final Appeal and a part-time justice of the Supreme Court of Fiji and the Court of Appeal of Fiji.

Eichelbaum died in Wellington on 31 October 2018, having been predeceased by his wife, Vida, Lady Eichelbaum, in 2013.

Legal offices
Preceded by Ronald Davison	Chief Justice of New Zealand; 1989–1999	Succeeded by Sian Elias
