= Miss Venezuela 2010 =

57th edition of the Miss Venezuela competition

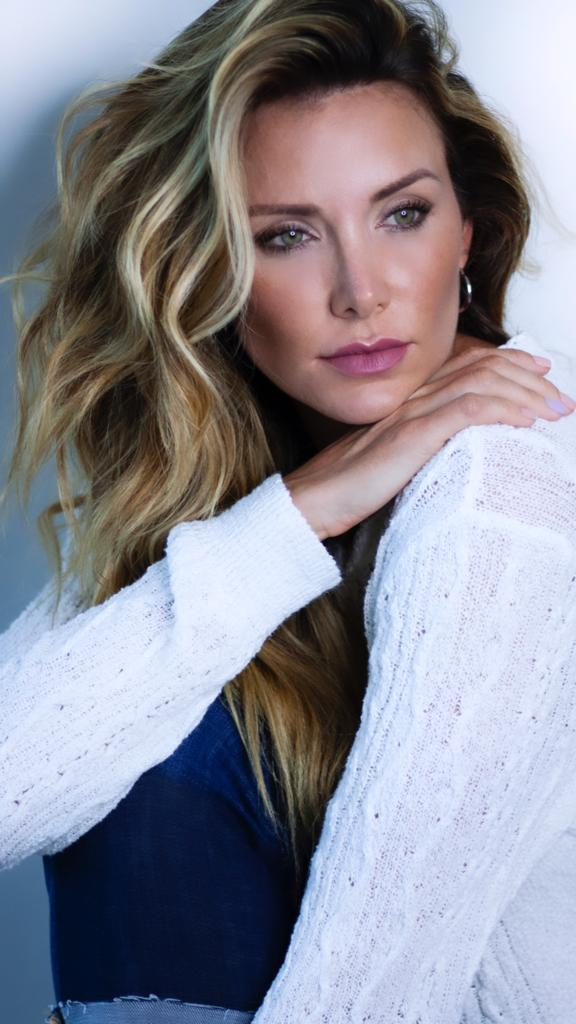
- Vanessa Gonçalves
- Date: October 28, 2010
- Presenters: Maite Delgado; Boris Izaguirre; Chiquinquirá Delgado; Viviana Gibelli
- Entertainment: Chino & Nacho; Jorge Celedón; Lila Morillo; Kiara
- Venue: Palacio de Eventos de Venezuela, Maracaibo, Venezuela
- Broadcaster: Venevisión; Venevision Plus; DirecTV; Univision
- Entrants: 28
- Placements: 10
- Winner: Vanessa Gonçalves; Miranda
- Congeniality: Jéssica Ibarra; Trujillo
- Photogenic: Caroline Medina; Aragua

Miss Venezuela 2010 was the fifty-seventh Miss Venezuela pageant, held at the Palacio de Eventos de Venezuela in Maracaibo, Venezuela, on October 28, 2010.

Marelisa Gibson crowned Vanessa Gonçalves of Miranda as her successor at the end of the event. Gonçalves represented Venezuela at Miss Universe 2011 and placed as a top-sixteen semifinalist.

== Results ==
=== Placements ===
Color key

- Declared as Winner
- Ended as Runner-up
- Ended as one of the Finalists or Semi-finalists

Placement	Contestant	International Placement
Miss Venezuela 2010	Miranda – Vanessa Gonçalves	Top 16
Miss Venezuela World 2010	Amazonas – Ivian Sarcos	Winner
Miss Venezuela International 2010	Distrito Capital – Jessica Barboza	1st Runner-Up
Miss Venezuela Earth 2010	Aragua – Caroline Medina	Miss Earth – Fire
1st Runner-Up	Monagas – Angela Ruiz	
Top 10	Canaima – Estefanía Nebot Peña; Carabobo – Romina Palmisano; Costa Oriental – Karen Soto; Nueva Esparta – Melanie Reza Félix; Zulia – Estefani Araujo	

=== Special awards ===
Award	Contestant
Miss Fotogénica (Miss Photogenic)	Aragua – Caroline Medina
Miss Amistad (Miss Congeniality)	Trujillo – Jéssica Ibarra
Miss Internet	Falcón – Liliana Flores
Mejores Vestidos de Gala (Best Evening Gowns)	Cojedes – Eliana Calicchia; Miranda – Vanessa Gonçalves; Zulia – Estefani Araujo

=== Gala de la Belleza (Beauty Gala) ===
This preliminary event took place on October 16, 2010, at the Estudio 1 de Venevisión, hosted by Leonardo Villalobos. The following awards were given:

Award	Contestant
El Mejor Cuerpo Dermocell (Dermocell Best Body)	Miranda – Vanessa Gonçalves
Miss Pasarela (Best Catwalk)	Yaracuy – Andrea Escobar
Miss Personalidad (Best Personality)	Carabobo – Romina Palmisano
Miss Elegancia (Miss Elegance)	Lara – María Jose Zavarce
La Piel Mas Linda Beducen (Beducen Most Beautiful Skin)	Bolívar – Ángela La Padula
Miss Rostro L'Bel (L'Bel Most Beautiful Face)	Amazonas – Ivian Sarcos

== Contestants ==
Twenty-eight contestants competed for the four titles.

State	Contestant	Age	Height	Hometown
Amazonas	Ivian Lunasol Sarcos Colmenares	21	180 cm (5 ft 11 in)	Guanare
Anzoátegui	Verónica Liliana González Castillo	18	176 cm (5 ft 9 1/2 in)	Caracas
Apure	Ana Tábata Rodríguez Donnarumma	18	185 cm (6 ft 1 in)	San Fernando de Apure
Aragua	Caroline Gabriela Medina Peschiutta	18	178 cm (5 ft 10 in)	Maracay
Barinas	Kelly Stephanny Martínez Dominguez	22	178 cm (5 ft 10 in)	Caracas
Bolívar	Angela La Padula Peluso	19	178 cm (5 ft 10 in)	Ciudad Guayana
Canaima	Estefanía Nebot Peña	22	176 cm (5 ft 9 1/2 in)	Caracas
Carabobo	Romina Palmisano Giacche	20	178 cm (5 ft 10 in)	Valencia
Cojedes	Eliana Catherina Calicchia Arcila	24	176 cm (5 ft 9 1/2 in)	Valencia
Costa Oriental	Karen Andrea Soto Lugo	18	179 cm (5 ft 10 1/2 in)	Maracaibo
Delta Amacuro	Yaisbel Nohely Arteaga Polanco	21	179 cm (5 ft 10 1/2 in)	Puerto Cabello
Dependencias Federales	Axel Carolina López Aldana	20	176 cm (5 ft 9 1/2 in)	Caracas
Distrito Capital	Jessica Cristina Barboza Schmidt	22	179 cm (5 ft 10 1/2 in)	Maracaibo
Falcón	Liliana María Flores Arenas	23	175 cm (5 ft 9 in)	Coro
Guárico	Andrea Estefanía Vásquez Annicchiarico	19	178 cm (5 ft 10 in)	Caracas
Lara	María José Zavarce Alvarado	18	180 cm (5 ft 11 in)	Barquisimeto
Mérida	María Teresa Iannuzzo Lucena	22	176 cm (5 ft 9 1/2 in)	Carora
Miranda	Vanessa Andrea Gonçalves Gómez	24	176 cm (5 ft 9 1/2 in)	Baruta
Monagas	Angela Julieta Ruiz Pérez	18	178 cm (5 ft 10 in)	Maturín
Nueva Esparta	Melanie Reza Félix	18	180 cm (5 ft 11 in)	Caracas
Peninsula de Paraguana	Isabel Cristina Castillo Cedeño	25	178 cm (5 ft 10 in)	Valencia
Portuguesa	Mariuska Montes Estevez	19	178 cm (5 ft 10 in)	Caracas
Sucre	Adriana Cristina Kuper Osorio	21	174 cm (5 ft 8 1/2 in)	Maracay
Táchira	Germania Andrea Pimiento Vera	18	180 cm (5 ft 11 in)	San Cristóbal
Trujillo	Jéssica Carely Ibarra Petit	24	178 cm (5 ft 10 in)	Cabimas
Vargas	Daniela Josefina Raldirez Salazar	19	179 cm (5 ft 10 1/2 in)	La Guaira
Yaracuy	Andrea Carolina Escobar Colombo	22	178 cm (5 ft 10 in)	Barquisimeto
Zulia	Estefani Carolina Araujo Cano	18	178 cm (5 ft 10 in)	Maracaibo

=== Contestants Notes ===
- Vanessa Gonçalves placed as semifinalist (Top 16) in Miss Universe 2011 in São Paulo, Brazil.
- Ivian Sarcos was crowned Miss World 2011 in London, United Kingdom, becoming the sixth Venezuelan to get the title.
- Jessica Barboza placed as 1st runner-up in Miss International 2011 in Chengdu, China.
- Caroline Medina placed as 3rd runner-up (Miss Earth Fire) in Miss Earth 2011 in Quezon City, Philippines. She previously won Reina Hispanoamericana 2010 in Bolivia.
- Angela Ruiz placed as Virreina (2nd place) in Reinado Internacional del Café 2011 in Colombia. Later, she placed as 5th runner-up in Reina Hispanoamericana 2011 in Bolivia.
- Karen Soto won Miss World Next Top Model 2011 in Beirut, Lebanon. She also won Miss Venezuela Mundo 2013 but unplaced in Miss World 2013 in Bali, Indonesia.
- Axel López (Dependencias Federales) placed as 1st runner-up in Miss Caraibes Hibiscus 2010 in Saint Martin. Later, she placed at the same position in Reina Mundial del Banano 2014 in Ecuador.
- Angela La Padula (Bolívar) placed as 3rd runner-up in Miss Italia Nel Mondo 2011 in Italy.
- Adriana Kuper (Sucre) unplaced in Reina Hispanoamericana 2012 in Bolivia.
