= Universidad Santa María (Venezuela) =

University in Caracas, Venezuela

Coordinates: 10°29′32″N 66°46′48″W

Saint Mary University
- Universidad Santa María
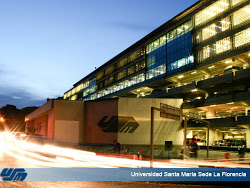
- Motto: "A challenge to excellence"
- Type: Private
- Established: 13 October 1953
- Rector: Ciro Nicolás Sosa Flores
- Students: 20,000 approximately
- Location: Caracas, Distrito Capital (Capital of Venezuela), Venezuela
- Campus: Urban Approximately 450,000 square meters
- Colors: Blue and White
- Nickname: USM
- Website: usm.edu.ve

Saint Mary University (Spanish: Universidad Santa María, USM) is a private university in Venezuela. USM has campuses in several cities, such as Caracas (where the main campus is located), Puerto La Cruz, Barinas and Puerto Ayacucho.

The university was founded in 1953 by Lola de Fuenmayor in El Paraíso neighborhood (Southwestern Caracas). In 1983, the main campus of the university was built in La Florencia (East Caracas).

== Emblems and symbols ==
The inscription on the school's shield reads: Saint Mary University (Spanish: Universidad Santa María) founded in 1953, with the words God, Country and Home.

The university's flag is light blue with the university's shield in the center, usually placed in the central square with the national flag.

The university's mascot is a lion. In the past, there was a real lion named Ibrahim, a lioness named Luna, and later a lion called Friguela. The university no longer has a real lion at the campus.

== Degrees ==
The university has 5 faculties:

- Law college:
  - Law
  - International Studies
- College of Social and Humanistic Sciences:
  - Social communication
  - Business Administration
  - Economics
  - Public Accounting
- College of Engineering:
  - Civil Engineering
  - Industrial Engineering
  - Telecommunications Engineering
  - Systems Engineering
  - Architecture
- Dentistry: Odontology
- Pharmacy

== Headquarters ==
=== Headquarter, The Florence (Spanish: La Florencia) ===
It is built on an area of 450,000 square meters, of which 200,000 are infrastructure including buildings (15 in total, where the various faculties and administrative offices are located), internal circulation roads and green areas. In this place all races work: Administration, Accounting, Economics, Social Communication, Law, International Studies, Pharmacy, Civil Engineering, Industrial, Systems and Telecommunications; Architecture and Odontology.

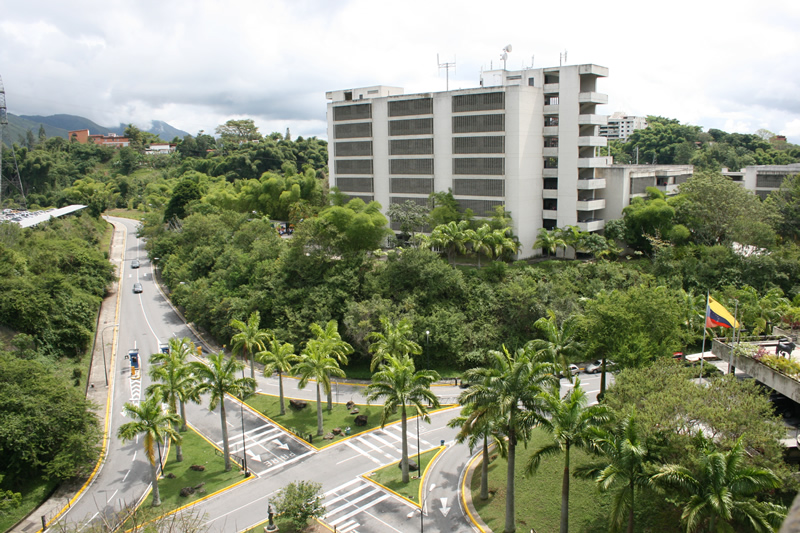
Campus Saint Mary University

Student groups, The Florence At the headquarters of the Florence they are constituted multiple student teams that promote university life in the institution, among them are:

- C.R.E.O: commitment, responsibility, excellence and organization.

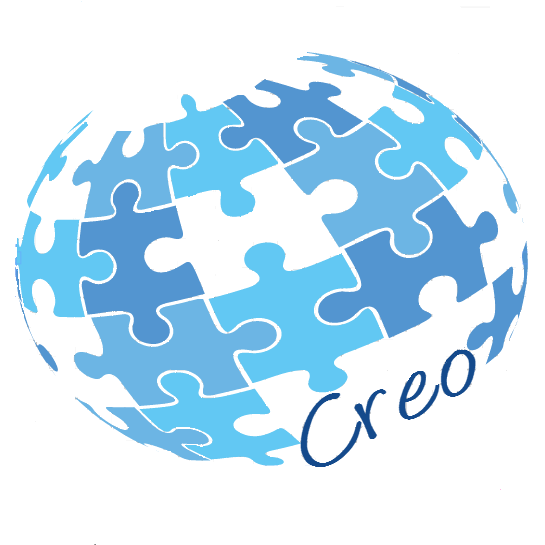
CN3RLLW1

- ConseUSM
- Action Usemista
- Eimun MUN School of International Studies at the Saint Mary University

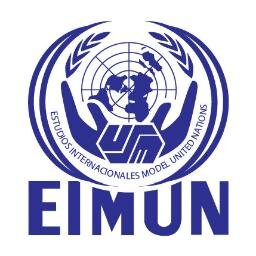
EIMUN USM

- USM delegation

Currently in management University Student Government the following facilities:

- Student Center School of Law (CED USM)
- Student Center School of International Studies (CEEI USM)
- Student Center of the Faculty of Engineering and Architecture (CEFIA USM)
- Student Center of the School of Social Communication (CECOSSMA USM)
- Student Center Schools Administration and Accounting (ECAC USM)
- Student Center School of Economics (EEC USM)
- Student Center of the Faculty of Pharmacy (CEF USM)
- Student Center of the School of Dentistry (CEO USM)

=== Postgraduate Headquarter ===
The original headquarters is located in The Paradise (Spanish:El Paraiso), keeping its historical interest was completely remodeled to become the great Center of Postgraduate Studies. Currently it is appropriate and central building, with classrooms and amphitheaters designed for these studies. Library, parking and other services, where extension courses, specialization and master's degrees as well as doctorates are held.

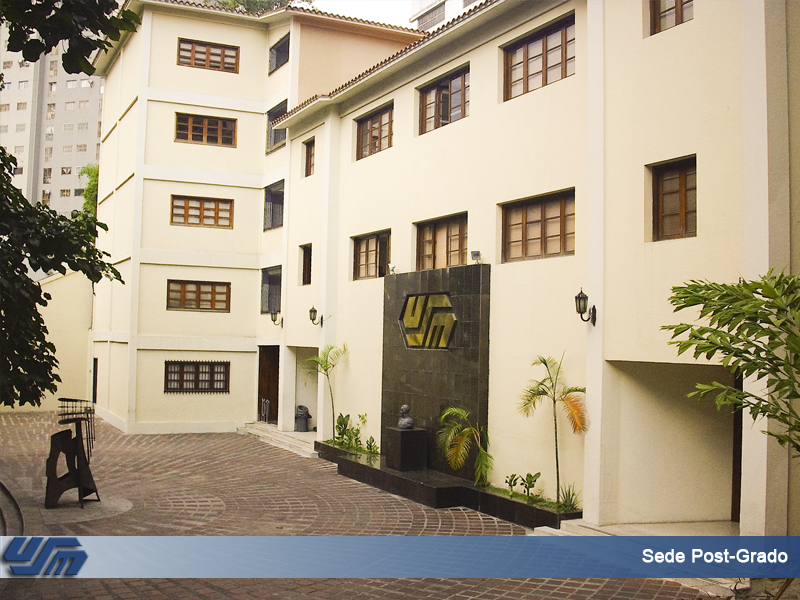
Postgraduate Headquarter

=== Headquarter East-Puerto La Cruz ===
Among the projects decentralization in 1994 Saint Mary University is established with its own headquarters in Barcelona, Anzoategui, based on a modern building set in 28,000 square meters of land located in the intercommunal Avenue Barcelona.

This important site starts working on January 23, 1995, and has classrooms acclimated to the area design; library, also adapted to the environment, computer labs. It is an educational complex with parking, all services and modern café located in a small shopping center surrounded by green areas.

=== Amazon Headquarter-Puerto Ayacucho ===
Saint Mary University founded in 1999 in the Amazon a university nucleus where students study law, economics, accounting and business administration state. This office works in two shifts: morning and night.

In this seat racing law, social communication, accounting, administration, pharmacy, civil engineering, industrial and systems work.

=== Headquarter Barinas ===
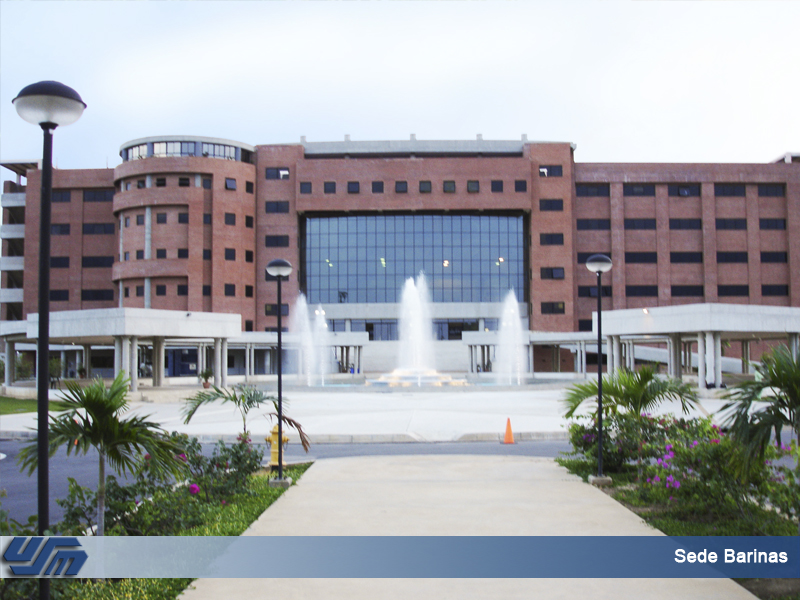
Headquarters Barinas

This core began operations in 2004 and emerged as an academic option to capture a large student population eager to train in social sciences, scientific and administrative area.

In this place students study law, Social Communication, Accounting, Civil Engineering, Industrial and Systems.

== Saint Mary Firefighters ==
The Volunteer Fire Department University is a nonprofit organization founded on May 10, 2010, in order to create an institution within the campus to provide protection to the student and working population; while it is offering to anyone who wishes to be part of this body the opportunity to become a professional firefighter University.

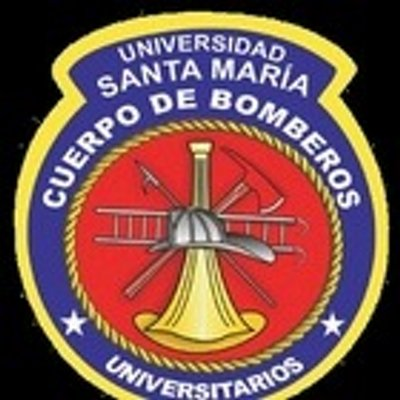
Firefighters Shield

== Notable alumni ==
- Antonio Ledezma: Venezuelan Politician
- Tarek Saab: Venezuelan Politician
- Sthefany Gutiérrez: Miss Venezuela 2017
- Vanessa Gonçalves: Miss Venezuela 2010
- Juan Alfonso Baptista: Venezuelan Actor
- Naomi Soazo: Paralympic Gold Medalist (Beijing 2008/Rio 2016)
- Ángel David Revilla: Venezuelan-Argentinian YouTuber and Writer
