= Pizzagate conspiracy theory =

Debunked conspiracy theory about alleged child sex ring

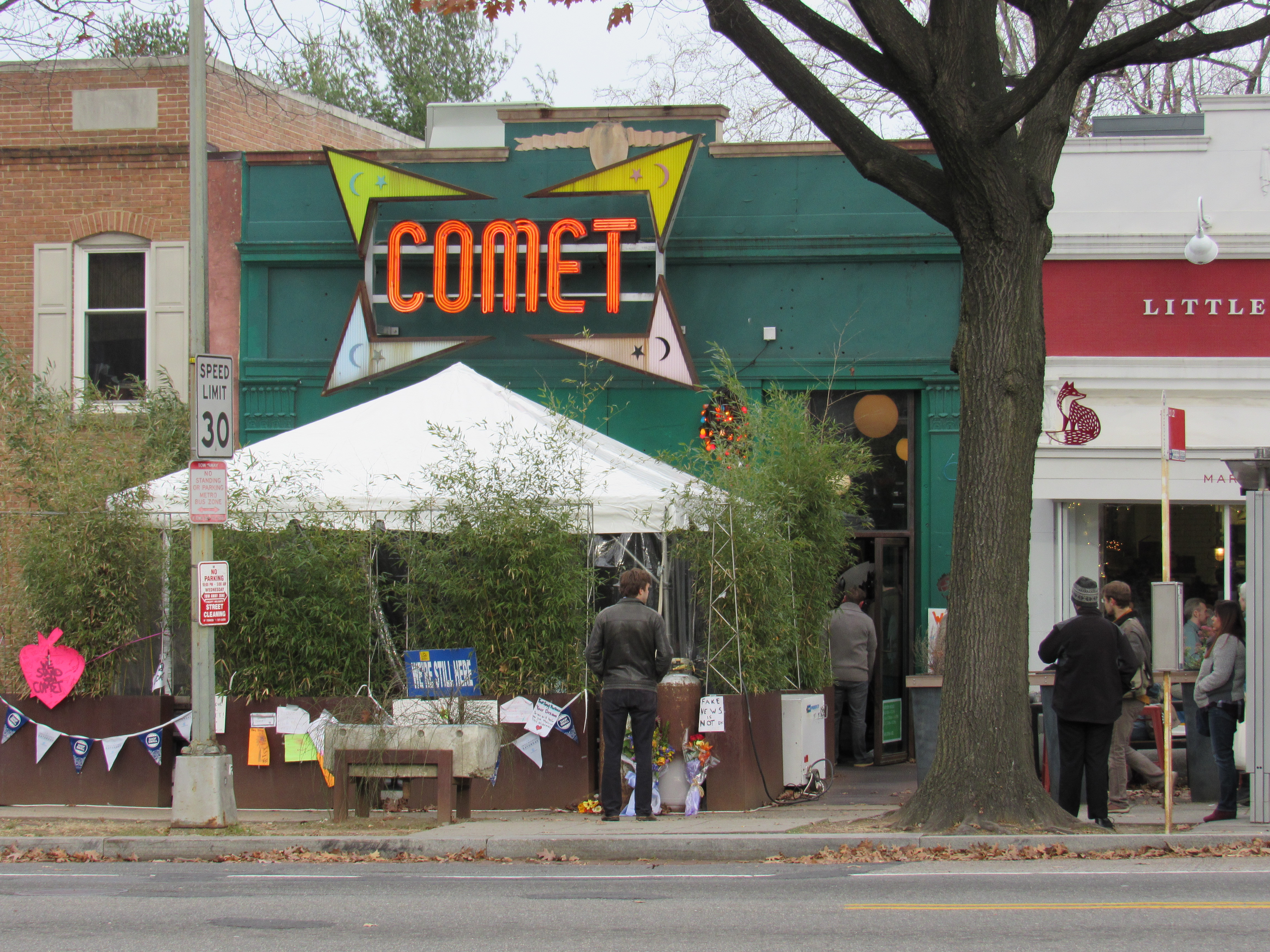
Proponents of Pizzagate connected Comet Ping Pong (pictured) to a fictitious child sex ring.

"Pizzagate" is a conspiracy theory that went viral during the 2016 United States presidential election cycle, falsely claiming that the New York City Police Department (NYPD) had discovered a pedophile ring linked to members of the Democratic Party while searching through Anthony Weiner's emails. It has been extensively discredited by a wide range of organizations, including the Washington, D.C. police.

The personal email account of John Podesta, Hillary Clinton's campaign chair, was hacked in a spear-phishing attack in March 2016. WikiLeaks published his emails in November 2016. Proponents of the Pizzagate conspiracy theory falsely claimed the emails contained coded messages that connected several high-ranking Democratic Party officials and U.S. restaurants with an alleged human-trafficking and child sex ring. One of the establishments allegedly involved was the Comet Ping Pong pizzeria in Washington, D.C.

Members of the alt-right, conservative journalists and others who had urged Clinton's prosecution over her use of an unrelated private email server spread the conspiracy theory on social media outlets such as 4chan, 8chan, Reddit and Twitter. In response, a man from North Carolina traveled to Comet Ping Pong to investigate the conspiracy and fired a rifle inside the restaurant to break the lock on a door to a storage room during his search. In addition, the restaurant's owner and staff received death threats from conspiracy theorists.

Pizzagate is generally considered a predecessor to the QAnon conspiracy theory. It also generated another offshoot conspiracy theory, called Frazzledrip, which involved Hillary Clinton participating in the ritual murder of a child. Pizzagate resurged in 2020, mainly due to QAnon, and again in 2026 during the release of the Epstein files. While initially it was spread by only the far-right, it has since been spread by users on TikTok "who don't otherwise fit a right-wing conspiracy theorist mold: the biggest Pizzagate spreaders on TikTok appear to otherwise be mostly interested in topics of viral dance moves and Black Lives Matter". The conspiracy theory has developed and become less partisan and political in nature, with less emphasis on Clinton and more on an alleged worldwide elite of child sex-traffickers.

== Origins ==
=== Genesis ===
David Goldberg
(@DavidGoldbergNY)
tweeted:

Rumors stirring in the NYPD that Huma's emails point to a pedophila ring and @HillaryClinton is at the center. #GoHillary #PodestaEmails23

October 30, 2016

On October 30, 2016, a Twitter account posting white supremacist material which said it was run by a Jewish New York lawyer falsely claimed that the New York City Police Department (NYPD) had discovered a pedophilia ring linked to members of the Democratic Party while searching through Anthony Weiner's emails. Throughout October and November 2016, WikiLeaks had published John Podesta's emails. Proponents of the conspiracy theory read the emails and alleged they contained code words for pedophilia and human trafficking. Proponents also claimed that Comet Ping Pong, a pizzeria in Washington, D.C., was a meeting ground for Satanic ritual abuse.

Deriving its name from the Watergate scandal, the story was later posted on fake news websites, starting with Your News Wire, which cited a 4chan post from earlier that year. The Your News Wire article was subsequently spread by pro-Trump websites, including SubjectPolitics.com, which added the claim that the NYPD had raided Hillary Clinton's property. The Conservative Daily Post ran a headline claiming the Federal Bureau of Investigation had confirmed the conspiracy theory.

=== Spread on social media ===
According to the BBC, the allegations spread to "the mainstream internet" several days before the 2016 U.S. presidential election, after Reddit user "DumbScribblyUnctious" posted a Pizzagate "evidence" document to r/TheDonald The original Reddit post, removed some time between November 4 and 21, alleged the involvement of Comet Ping Pong:

Everyone associated with the business is making semi-overt, semi-tongue-in-cheek, and semi-sarcastic inferences towards sex with minors. The artists that work for and with the business also generate nothing but cultish imagery of disembodiment, blood, beheadings, sex, and of course pizza.

The story was picked up by other fake news websites like InfoWars, Planet Free Will and The Vigilant Citizen, and was promoted by alt-right activists such as Mike Cernovich, Brittany Pettibone and Jack Posobiec. Other promoters included David Seaman, former writer for TheStreet.com, CBS46 anchor Ben Swann, basketball player Andrew Bogut, and Minecraft creator Markus "Notch" Persson, as well as the German edition of The Epoch Times, a far-right Falun Gong-associated newspaper. On December 30, as Bogut recovered from a knee injury, members of /r/The Donald community on Reddit promoted a false theory that his injury was connected to his support for Pizzagate. Jonathan Albright, an assistant professor of media analytics at Elon University, said that a disproportionate number of tweets about Pizzagate came from the Czech Republic, Cyprus and Vietnam, and that some of the most frequent retweeters were bots.

Members of the subreddit r/The_Donald created the /r/pizzagate subreddit to further develop the conspiracy theory. The sub was banned on November 23, 2016, for violating Reddit's anti-doxing policy after users posted personal details of people connected to the alleged conspiracy. Reddit released a statement afterwards, saying, "We don't want witchhunts on our site". After the ban on Reddit, the discussion was moved to the v/pizzagate sub on Voat, a now-defunct Reddit clone dedicated to far-right content.

Some of Pizzagate's proponents, including David Seaman and Michael G. Flynn (Michael Flynn's son), evolved the conspiracy into a broader government conspiracy called "Pedogate". According to this theory, a "satanic cabal of elites" of the New World Order operates international child sex trafficking rings.

By June 2020, the conspiracy theory found renewed popularity on TikTok, where videos tagged #Pizzagate were reaching over 80 million views (see relevant section).

=== Turkish press reports ===
In Turkey, the allegations were reported by pro-government newspapers (i.e., those supportive of President Recep Tayyip Erdoğan), such as Sabah, A Haber, Yeni Şafak, Akşam and Star. The story appeared on Turkey's Ekşi Sözlük website and on the viral news network HaberSelf, where anyone can post content. These forums reposted images and allegations directly from the since-deleted subreddit, which were reprinted in full in the state-controlled press. Efe Sozeri, a columnist for The Daily Dot, suggested Turkish government sources were pushing this story to distract attention from a child abuse scandal there in March 2016.

== Harassment of restaurant owners and employees ==
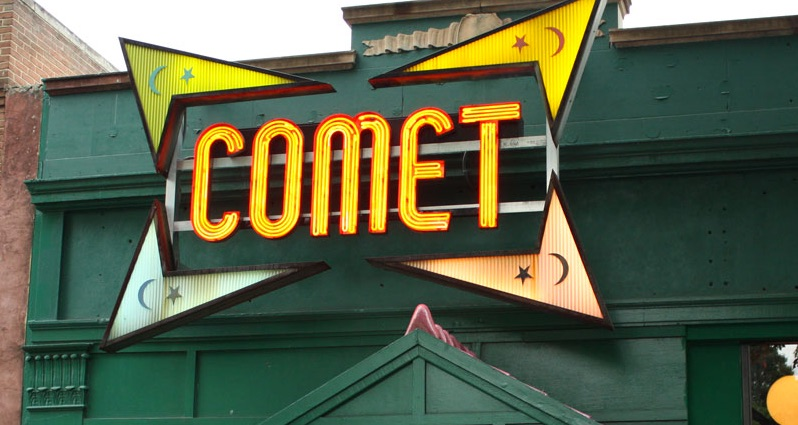
The pizzeria, Comet Ping Pong, was threatened by hundreds of people who believed in the Pizzagate conspiracy theory.

As Pizzagate spread, Comet Ping Pong received hundreds of threats from the theory's believers. The restaurant's owner, James Alefantis, told The New York Times: "From this insane, fabricated conspiracy theory, we've come under constant assault. I've done nothing for days but try to clean this up and protect my staff and friends from being terrorized."

Some adherents identified the Instagram account of Alefantis and pointed to some of the photos posted there as evidence of the conspiracy. Many of the images shown were friends and family who had liked Comet Ping Pong's page on Facebook. In some cases, imagery was taken from unrelated websites and purported to be Alefantis' own. The restaurant's owners and staff were harassed and threatened on social media websites, and the owner received death threats. The restaurant's Yelp page was locked by the site's operators citing reviews that were "motivated more by the news coverage itself than the reviewer's personal consumer experience".

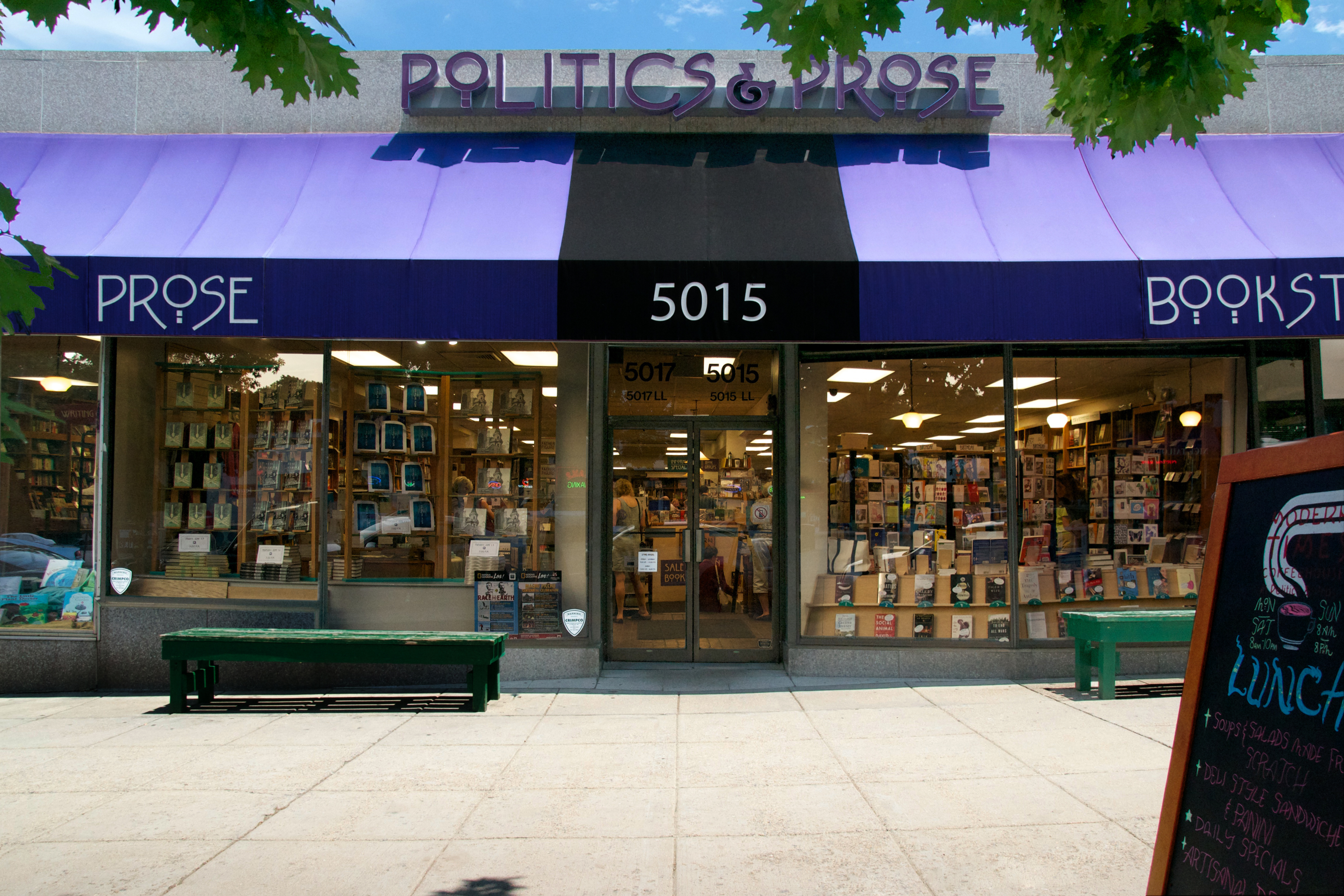
Politics and Prose was among some of the D.C. businesses that were also harassed due to the Pizzagate conspiracy theory.

Several bands who had performed at the pizzeria also faced harassment. For example, Amanda Kleinman of Heavy Breathing deleted her Twitter account after receiving negative comments connecting her and her band to the conspiracy theory. Another band, Sex Stains, had closed the comments of their YouTube videos and addressed the controversy in the description of their videos. The artist Arrington de Dionyso, who once had painted a mural at the pizzeria that had been painted over several years before the controversy, described the campaign of harassment against him in detail, and said of the attacks in general, "I think it's a very deliberate assault, which will eventually be a coordinated assault on all forms of free expression." The affair has drawn comparisons with the Gamergate harassment campaign.

Pizzagate-related harassment of businesses extended beyond Comet Ping Pong to include other nearby D.C. businesses such as Besta Pizza, three doors down from Comet; Little Red Fox cafe; bookstore Politics and Prose; and French bistro, Terasol. These businesses received a high volume of threatening and menacing telephone calls, including death threats, and also experienced online harassment. The co-owners of Little Red Fox and Terasol filed police reports.

Brooklyn restaurant Roberta's was also pulled into the hoax, receiving harassing phone calls, including a call from an unidentified person telling an employee that she was "going to bleed and be tortured". The restaurant became involved after a since-removed YouTube video used images from their social media accounts to imply they were part of the hoax sex ring. Others then spread the accusations on social media, claiming the "Clinton family loves Roberta's".

East Side Pies, in Austin, Texas, saw one of its delivery trucks vandalized with an epithet, and was the target of online harassment related to their supposed involvement in Pizzagate, alleged connections to the Central Intelligence Agency and the Illuminati.

The Federal Bureau of Investigation investigated Pizzagate-related threats in March 2017 as part of a probe into possible Russian interference in the 2016 United States elections.

== Criminal responses ==
=== Shooting incident ===
Criminal allegations filed against Edgar Welch (full text)

Edgar Maddison Welch, a 28-year-old man from Salisbury, North Carolina, arrived at Comet Ping Pong and fired three shots from an AR-15-style rifle that struck the restaurant's walls, a desk and a door on December 4, 2016. Welch later told police that he had planned to "self-investigate" the conspiracy theory. Welch saw himself as the potential hero of the story—a rescuer of children. He surrendered after officers surrounded the restaurant and was arrested without incident; no one was injured.

Welch told police he had read online that the Comet restaurant was harboring child sex slaves and that he wanted to see for himself if they were there. In an interview with The New York Times, Welch later said that he regretted how he had handled the situation but did not dismiss the conspiracy theory, and rejected the description of it as "fake news". Some conspiracy theorists speculated the shooting was a staged attempt to discredit their investigations.

Welch was charged with one count of "interstate transportation of a firearm with intent to commit an offense" (a federal crime) on December 13, 2016. According to court documents, Welch attempted to recruit friends three days before the attack by urging them to watch a YouTube video about the conspiracy. He was subsequently charged with two additional offenses, with the grand jury returning an indictment charging him with assault with a dangerous weapon and possession of a firearm during the commission of a crime.

Following a plea agreement with prosecutors, Welch pleaded guilty to the federal charge of interstate transport of firearms and the local District of Columbia charge of assault with a dangerous weapon on March 24, 2017. Welch also agreed to pay $5,744.33 for damages to the restaurant. U.S. District Judge (and future U.S. Supreme Court justice) Ketanji Brown Jackson sentenced Welch to four years in prison on June 22, 2017. At the sentencing hearing, Welch apologized for his conduct and said he had been "foolish and reckless". On March 3, 2020, Welch was transferred to a Community Corrections Center (CCC); he was released on May 28.

On January 4, 2025—eight years after the initial incident at Comet Ping Pong—two police officers from Kannapolis, North Carolina, pulled over Welch's vehicle at a traffic stop over an outstanding warrant for his arrest for a felony probation violation (Welch was a passenger in the vehicle). When they attempted to arrest him, he pulled out a gun and refused orders to drop it, and the officers shot him. Welch died two days later.

=== Other events ===
On January 12, 2017, Yusif Lee Jones, a 52-year-old man from Shreveport, Louisiana, pleaded guilty in the U.S. District Court for the Western District of Louisiana to making a threatening phone call to Besta Pizza, another pizzeria on the same block as Comet Ping Pong, three days after Welch's attack. He said he threatened Besta to "save the kids", and "finish what the other guy didn't".

The city of Portsmouth, England, experienced its own version of Pizzagate when the Scottish owner of a vaping business was targeted in what the Sunday Times called a "xenophobic campaign" in 2018. This lasted six months. The main culprit, Oliver Redmond, was prosecuted and sentenced to five months in prison. Judge William Mousley QC also imposed a three-year restraining order and was quoted as follows: "Mr Cheape said he saw 15 to 20 screenshots a day regarding him, his partner, and his business. It was described as a paedophile grooming operation, and the suggestion was made that the children were in the basement of the store, and he described that you were passing information on to his suppliers that he was a paedophile and that there was an international investigation involving Mr Cheape."

Comet Ping Pong suffered an arson attack when a fire was started in one of its backrooms on January 25, 2019. Employees quickly extinguished the blaze, and nobody was injured. The perpetrator escaped, but was arrested a few days later while climbing a fence at the Washington Monument and tied to the arson via security footage. He had posted a video referencing QAnon prior to the arson. On April 26, 2020, he was sentenced to four years in prison.

== Debunking ==
The conspiracy theory has been widely discredited and debunked. It has been judged to be false after detailed investigation by the fact-checking website Snopes.com and by The New York Times. Numerous news organizations have debunked it as a conspiracy theory, including The New York Observer, The Washington Post, The Independent, The Huffington Post, The Washington Times, the Los Angeles Times, Fox News, CNN, and the Miami Herald. The Metropolitan Police Department of the District of Columbia characterized the matter as "fictitious".

Much of the purported evidence cited by the conspiracy theory's proponents had been taken from entirely different sources and made to appear as if it supported the conspiracy. Images of children of family and friends of the pizzeria's staff were taken from social media sites such as Instagram and claimed to be photos of victims.

The New York Times published an article that analyzed the theory's claims on December 10, 2016. They emphasized that:

- Theorists linked the conspiracy to Comet Ping Pong through similarities between company logos and symbols related to Satanism and pedophilia. However, The Times noted similarities were also found in the logos of a number of unrelated companies such as AOL, Time Warner, and MSN.
- Theorists claimed an underground network beneath Comet Ping Pong; the restaurant has no basement, however, and the picture used to support this claim was taken in another facility.
- Theorists claimed to have a picture of restaurant owner Alefantis wearing a T-shirt endorsing pedophilia. However, the image was of another person, and the shirt, which read "J' ❤ L'Enfant" (French for "I ❤ The Child"), was actually a reference to the L'Enfant Cafe-Bar in D.C., whose owner was pictured in the image, and which itself is named after Pierre Charles L'Enfant, the designer of much of the layout of Washington, D.C.
- Theorists claimed John and Tony Podesta kidnapped Madeleine McCann in 2007 using police sketches that were, in fact, two sketches of the same suspect taken from the descriptions of two eyewitnesses. The descriptions mention the suspect was "aged between 20 and 40". However, in 2007, Tony Podesta was 64 and John Podesta was 58.

No alleged victims have come forward, and no physical evidence has been found.

== Responses ==
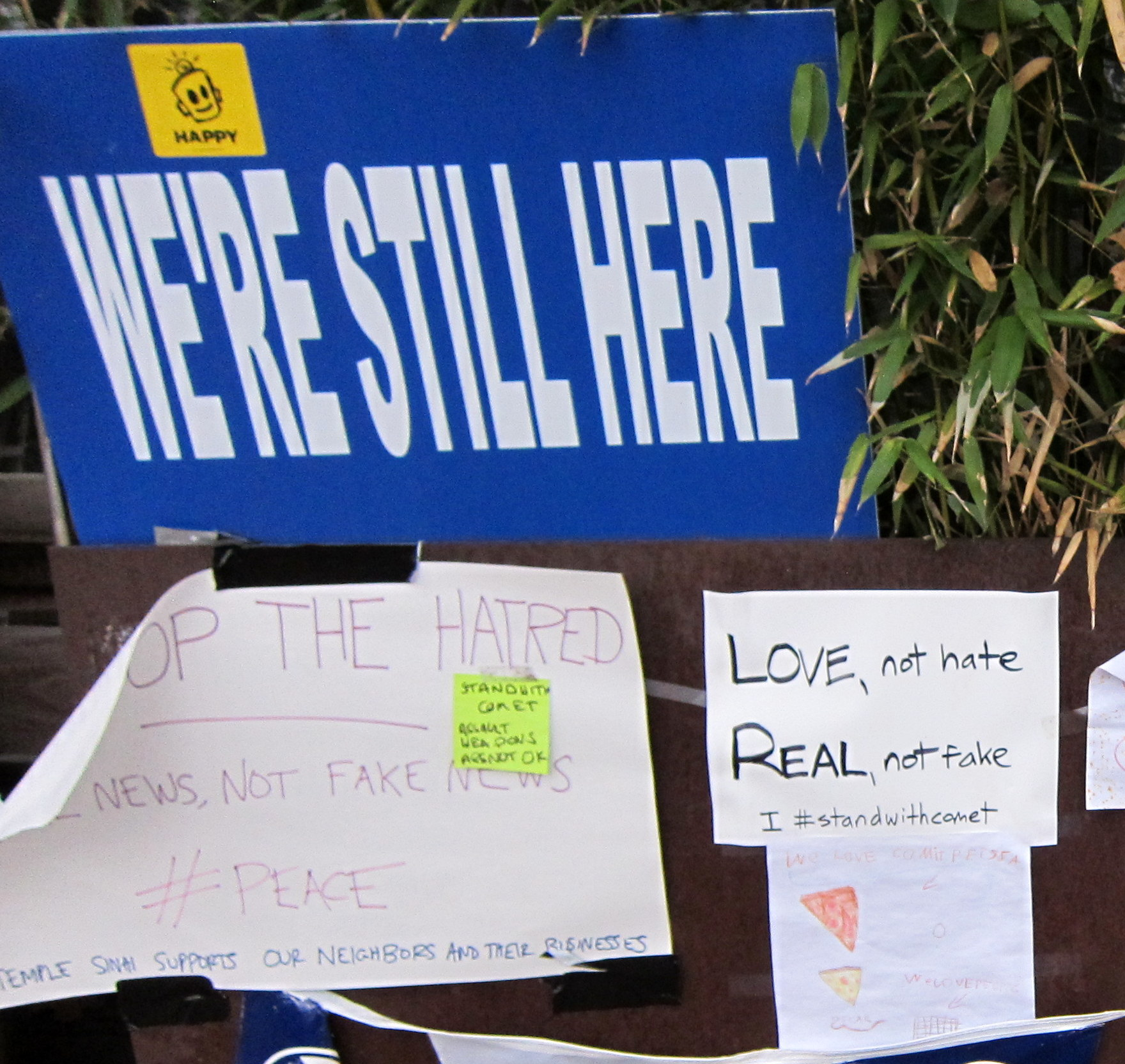
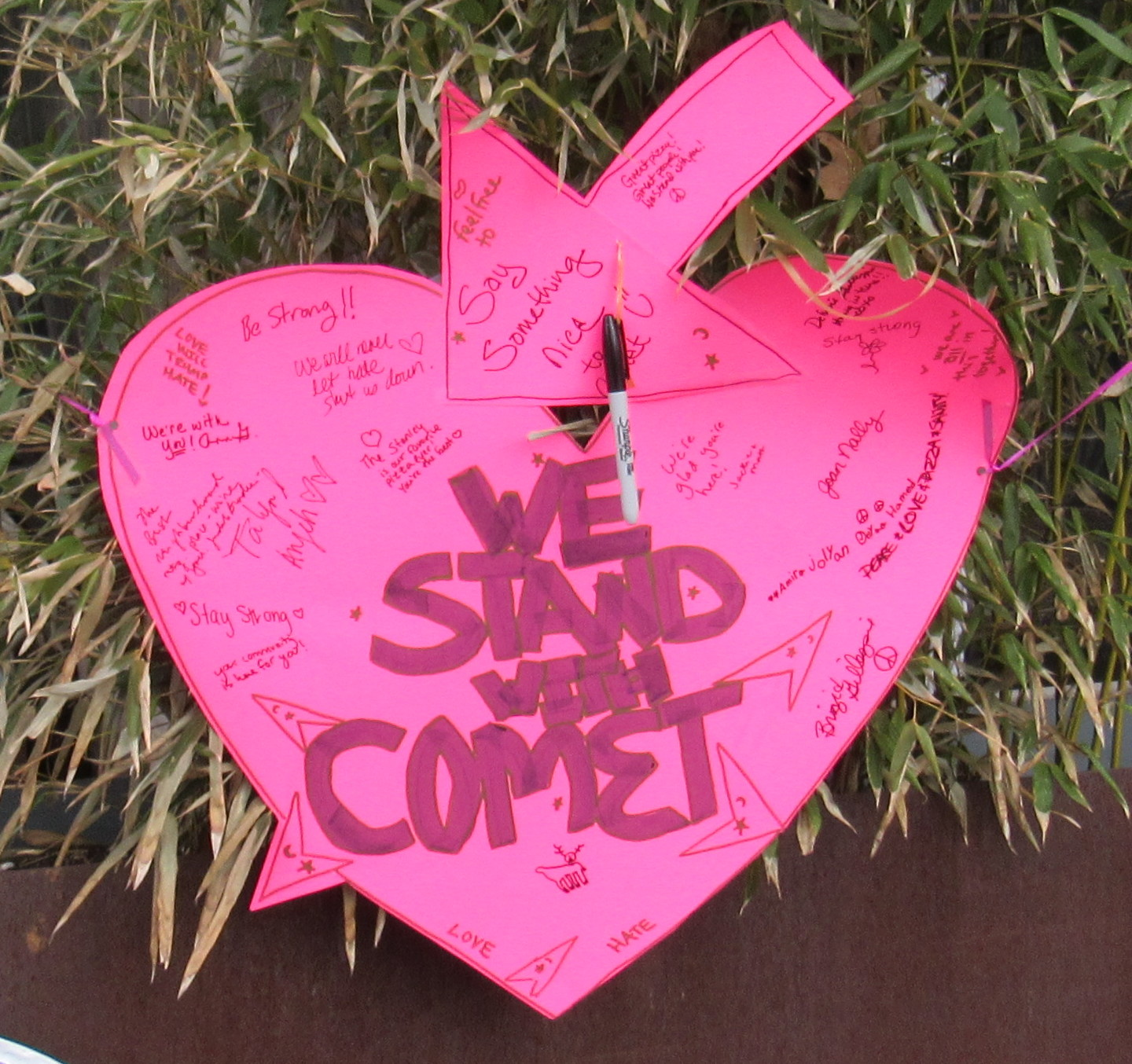
Community messages in front of Comet Ping Pong following the shooting

In an interview with NPR on November 27, 2016, Comet Ping Pong owner James Alefantis referred to the conspiracy theory as "an insanely complicated, made-up, fictional lie-based story" and a "coordinated political attack". Syndicated columnist Daniel Ruth wrote that the conspiracy theorists' assertions were "dangerous and damaging fake allegations" and that they were "repeatedly debunked, disproved, and dismissed".

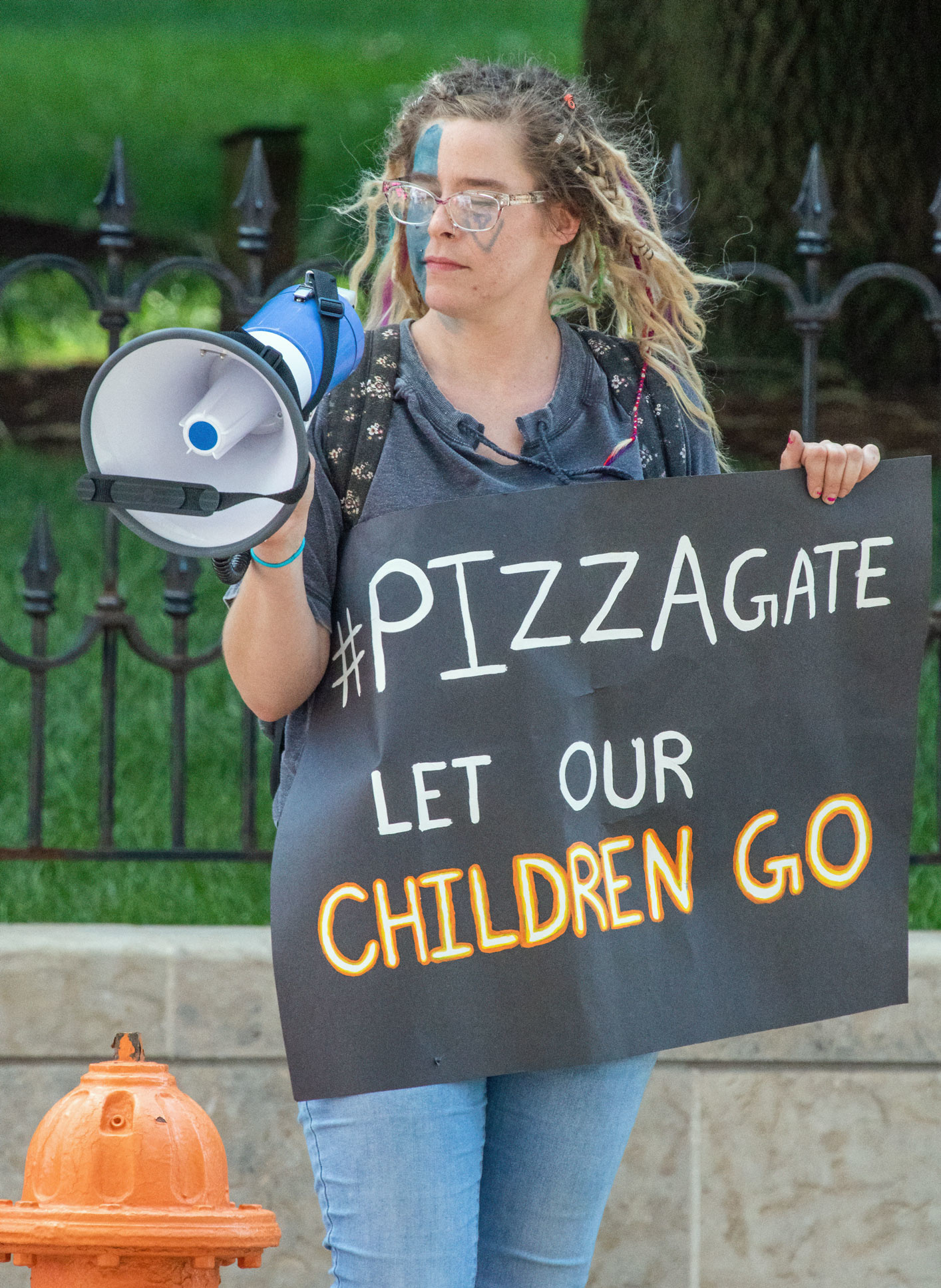
Pizzagate protester

Despite the conspiracy theory being debunked, it continued to spread on social media, with over one million messages using hashtag #Pizzagate on Twitter in November 2016. Stefanie MacWilliams, who wrote an article promoting the conspiracy on Planet Free Will, was subsequently reported by the Toronto Star as saying, "I really have no regrets and it's honestly really grown our audience". Pizzagate, she said, is "two worlds clashing. People don't trust the mainstream media anymore, but it's true that people shouldn't take the alternative media as truth, either".

On December 8, 2016, Hillary Clinton responded to the conspiracy theory, speaking about the dangers of fake news websites. She said, "The epidemic of malicious fake news and fake propaganda that flooded social media over the past year, it's now clear that so-called fake news can have real-world consequences".

=== Public opinion ===
A poll conducted by Public Policy Polling on December 6–7, 2016, asked 1,224 U.S. registered voters if they thought Hillary Clinton was "connected to a child sex ring being run out of a pizzeria in Washington DC." Nine percent of respondents said they believed she was connected, 72% said they did not, and 19% were not sure.

A poll of voters conducted on December 17–20 by The Economist/YouGov asked voters if they believed that "Leaked e-mails from the Clinton campaign talked about pedophilia and human trafficking – 'Pizzagate'." The results showed that 17% of Clinton voters responded "true" while 82% responded "not true"; and 46% of Trump voters responded "true" while 53% responded "not true".

Academic Roger Lancaster likened the impact of Pizzagate to the Satanic panic of the 1980s: at the time, hundreds of daycare workers were falsely accused of abusing children.

=== Alex Jones and InfoWars ===
After the Comet Ping Pong shooting, Alex Jones of InfoWars backed off from the idea that the D.C. pizzeria was the center of the conspiracy. On December 4, InfoWars uploaded a YouTube video that linked Pizzagate to the November 13 death of a sex-worker-rights activist. The video falsely claimed that she had been investigating a link between the Clinton Foundation and human trafficking in Haiti. It speculated she had been murdered in connection with her investigation. According to the activist's former employer, family, and friends, her death was in fact a suicide and she was not investigating the Clinton Foundation. By December 14, Infowars had removed two of its three Pizzagate-related videos.

In February 2017, Alefantis' lawyers sent Jones a letter demanding an apology and retraction. Under Texas law, Jones was given a month to comply or be subject to a libel suit. In March 2017, Alex Jones apologized to Alefantis for promulgating the conspiracy theory, saying: "To my knowledge today, neither Mr. Alefantis, nor his restaurant Comet Ping Pong, were involved in any human trafficking as was part of the theories about Pizzagate that were being written about in many media outlets and which we commented upon." InfoWars also issued a correction on its website and Jones said, "I want our viewers and listeners to know that we regret any negative impact our commentaries may have had on Mr. Alefantis, Comet Ping Pong, or its employees. We apologize to the extent our commentaries could be construed as negative statements about Mr. Alefantis or Comet Ping Pong, and we hope that anyone else involved in commenting on Pizzagate will do the same thing."

=== Michael Flynn and Michael Flynn Jr. ===
In the days leading up to the 2016 election, Michael Flynn, then a close supporter of Donald Trump and later Trump's National Security Advisor, posted multiple tweets on Twitter containing conspiratorial material regarding Hillary Clinton and her staff. They alleged that John Podesta drank the blood and bodily fluids of other humans in Satanic rituals, which Politico says "soon morphed into the '#pizzagate' conspiracy theory involving Comet Ping Pong". On November 2, 2016, Flynn tweeted a link to a story with unfounded accusations and wrote, "U decide – NYPD Blows Whistle on New Hillary Emails: Money Laundering, Sex Crimes w Children, etc ... MUST READ!" The tweet was shared by over 9,000 people, but was deleted from Flynn's account sometime during December 12–13, 2016.

After the shooting incident at Comet Ping Pong, Michael Flynn Jr., Michael T. Flynn's son and also a member of Trump's transition team, tweeted: "Until #Pizzagate proven to be false, it'll remain a story. The left seems to forget #PodestaEmails and the many 'coincidences' tied to it." On December 6, 2016, Flynn Jr. was forced out of Trump's transition team. Spokesman Jason Miller did not identify the reason for his dismissal; however, The New York Times reported that other officials had confirmed it was related to the tweet.

== Developments within QAnon ==
=== Merger with QAnon ===
Pizzagate became a pillar of the far-right QAnon conspiracy theory, which emerged in 2017 and incorporated its beliefs. QAnon, which has been likened in the media to "Pizzagate on steroids", and a "big-budget sequel" to Pizzagate, linked the child trafficking ring to a nefarious worldwide conspiracy. It also developed Pizzagate's claims by adding the concepts that the sexual abuses are part of Satanic rituals and that the abusers murder the children to "harvest" the adrenochrome from their blood, which they then use as a drug or as an elixir to remain youthful.

=== Frazzledrip ===
A related conspiracy theory known as "Frazzledrip" (sometimes spelled "Frazzled.rip") emerged in 2018, claiming that an "extreme snuff film" was recovered from Anthony Weiner's stolen laptop and was circulating on the dark web. According to that story, the file named "Frazzled.rip" was hidden in a folder called "life insurance" in Weiner's computer: the video contained in that file was said to show Hillary Clinton and Huma Abedin raping and murdering a young girl, drinking her adrenochrome-rich blood in a Satanic ritual, and "tak[ing] turns wearing the little girl's face like a mask".

Purported frames from the video circulated to back these claims: according to Snopes, some of these images came from a YouTube video originally posted on April Fools' Day 2018, and a photo which was said to show Huma Abedin wearing a mask had been taken from the website of a Washington, D.C. Indian restaurant and portrayed the owner of that establishment. Hundreds of videos on YouTube promoted these false statements, and the claims were still circulating internationally within QAnon groups two years later in 2020.

=== Global spread ===
In 2020, as the broader QAnon movement became an international phenomenon, Pizzagate also gained new traction and became less U.S.-centric in nature, with videos and posts on the topic in Italy, Brazil, Turkey and other countries worldwide each gaining millions of views. This new iteration is less partisan; the majority of the (mostly teenage) promoters of the #PizzaGate hashtag on TikTok were not right-wing, and support the Black Lives Matter movement. It focuses on an alleged global elite of child sex-traffickers, ranging from politicians to powerful businesspeople and celebrities such as Bill Gates, Tom Hanks, Ellen DeGeneres, Oprah Winfrey and Chrissy Teigen. Justin Bieber's 2020 song "Yummy" was alleged to be about the conspiracy theory, and rekindled support for the theory during the year. The conspiracy theory gained traction when Venezuelan YouTuber DrossRotzank made a video about Bieber's music video and its alleged references to Pizzagate. Rotzank's video gained 3 million views in two days and led "Pizzagate" to become a trending topic on the Spanish-language Twitter. Adherents of the theory also believe that Bieber gave a coded signal admitting as such in a later Instagram Live video, where he touched his hat after being asked to do so in the chat if he was a victim of Pizzagate (however, there is no indication that Bieber saw this comment).

In April 2020, a documentary promoting Pizzagate, Out of Shadows, was made by a former Hollywood stuntman and released on YouTube. TikTok users began promoting both Out of Shadows and the alleged Bieber association until the #PizzaGate hashtag was banned by the company. The New York Times said in June 2020 that posts on the platform with the #PizzaGate hashtag were "viewed more than 82 million times in recent months", and Google searches for the term also increased in that time. They also reported that "In the first week of June, comments, likes and shares of PizzaGate also spiked to more than 800,000 on Facebook and nearly 600,000 on Instagram, according to data from CrowdTangle ... That compares with 512,000 interactions on Facebook and 93,000 on Instagram during the first week of December 2016. From the start of 2017 through January 2020, the average number of weekly PizzaGate mentions, likes and shares on Facebook and Instagram was under 20,000".

In August 2020, Facebook temporarily suspended use of the "#savethechildren" hashtag, when used to promote elements of the Pizzagate conspiracy theory and QAnon. The improper use of the hashtag caused protests from the unrelated NGO Save the Children.

The Pizzagate Massacre, (originally titled Duncan), a dark satire film inspired by the Pizzagate conspiracy theory and Edgar Maddison Welch's shooting of Comet Ping Pong, was released on VOD in November 2021.

== See also ==
- Day-care sex-abuse hysteria – Moral panic and series of prosecutions
- Elm Guest House claims and controversy – English sexual abuse allegations
- Fake news websites in the United States
- Franklin child prostitution ring allegations – 1988 investigation in Nebraska
- List of conspiracy theories
- List of -gate scandals and controversies
- McMartin preschool trial – 1980s day care sexual abuse case
- Mass psychogenic illness – Spread of illness without organic cause
- Misinformation – Incorrect or misleading information
- Moral panic – Fear that some evil threatens society
- Murder of Seth Rich – 2016 unsolved murder in Washington, D.C., US
- Russian interference in the 2016 United States elections
- Satanic panic – Widespread moral panic alleging abuse
