= Blanca (restaurant) =

Restaurant in New York City

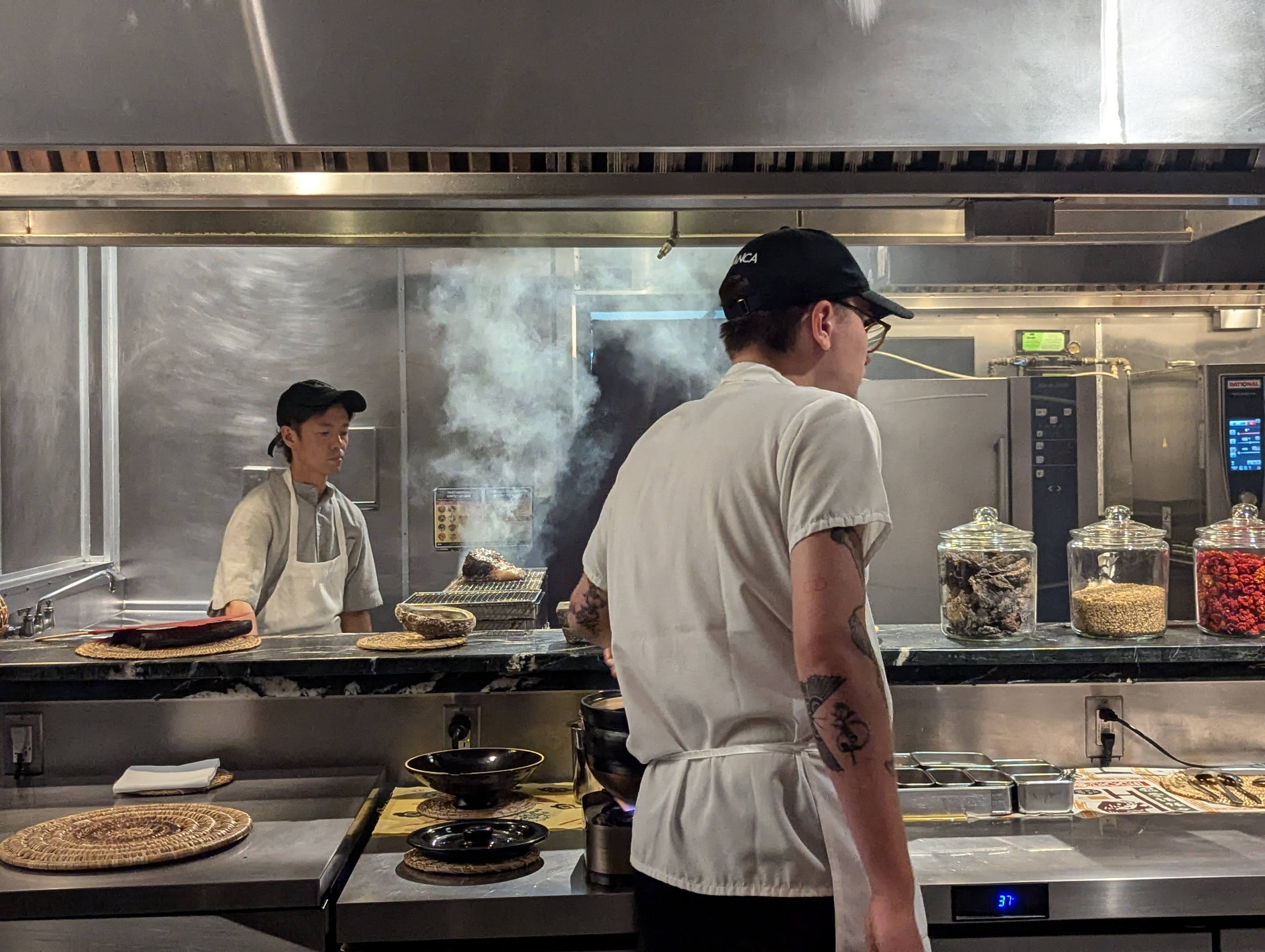
- Blanca's kitchen in 2024
- Interactive map of Blanca

Restaurant information
- Established: 2012
- Closed: April 12, 2025
- Location: 261 Moore Street, Brooklyn, New York, 11206, United States
- Coordinates: 40°42′18.2″N 73°56′0.9″W

Blanca was a fine dining restaurant that served tasting menus in Brooklyn, New York. It opened in 2012 behind Roberta's pizzeria.

The restaurant closed shortly after the beginning of the COVID-19 pandemic, but reopened in 2024. The restaurant had two Michelin stars at the time it closed but did not receive any Michelin stars in 2024 following its reopening.

Blanca closed on April 12, 2025 after the landlord did not renew the lease.

== See also ==
- List of Michelin-starred restaurants in New York City
