= Vanessa Gonçalves =

Venezuelan beauty pageant titleholder

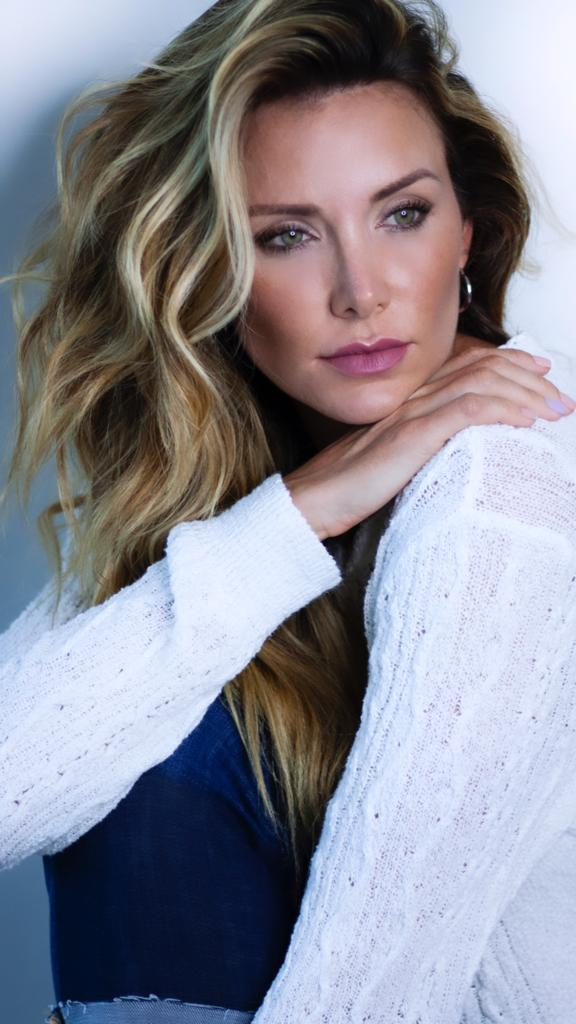
- Born: Vanessa Andrea Gonçalves Gomez; February 10, 1986 (age 40); Baruta, Venezuela
- Education: Universidad Santa María
- Height: 1.77 m (5 ft 9 1/2 in)
- Beauty pageant titleholder
- Title: Miss Venezuela 2010
- Hair color: Blonde
- Eye color: Green
- Major competitions: Miss Venezuela 2010; (Winner); Miss Universe 2011; (Top 16)

Vanessa Andrea Gonçalves Gomez (born February 10, 1986) is a Venezuelan yoga teacher, dentist, model and beauty pageant titleholder who was crowned Miss Venezuela 2010. She represented Venezuela at Miss Universe 2011 and placed in the Top 16.

== Pageantry ==
=== Miss Venezuela 2010 ===
Gonçalves, who stands 1.77 m (5 ft 10 in), competed as Miss Miranda, one of 28 finalists in her country's national beauty pageant Miss Venezuela 2010, held on October 28, 2010, in Maracaibo. She won the Best Body and Evening Gown awards and became the seventh Miss Venezuela winner from Miranda, gaining the right to represent her country in Miss Universe 2011.

=== Miss Universe 2011 ===
As Miss Venezuela 2010, she competed at Miss Universe 2011 on September 12, 2011, in São Paulo, Brazil and placed in the Top 16.

== Works ==
Gonçalves os the author of Soy Suficiente, Soy Vulnerable (I am Enough, I am Vulnerable).

== Personal life ==
Gonçalves is the daughter of Portuguese immigrants. She lives in Miami, Florida.

Awards and achievements
Preceded by Marelisa Gibson	Miss Venezuela; 2010	Succeeded by Irene Esser
Preceded by Marelisa Gibson	Miss Miranda; 2010	Succeeded by Isabel Zamora
