= Roberta's =

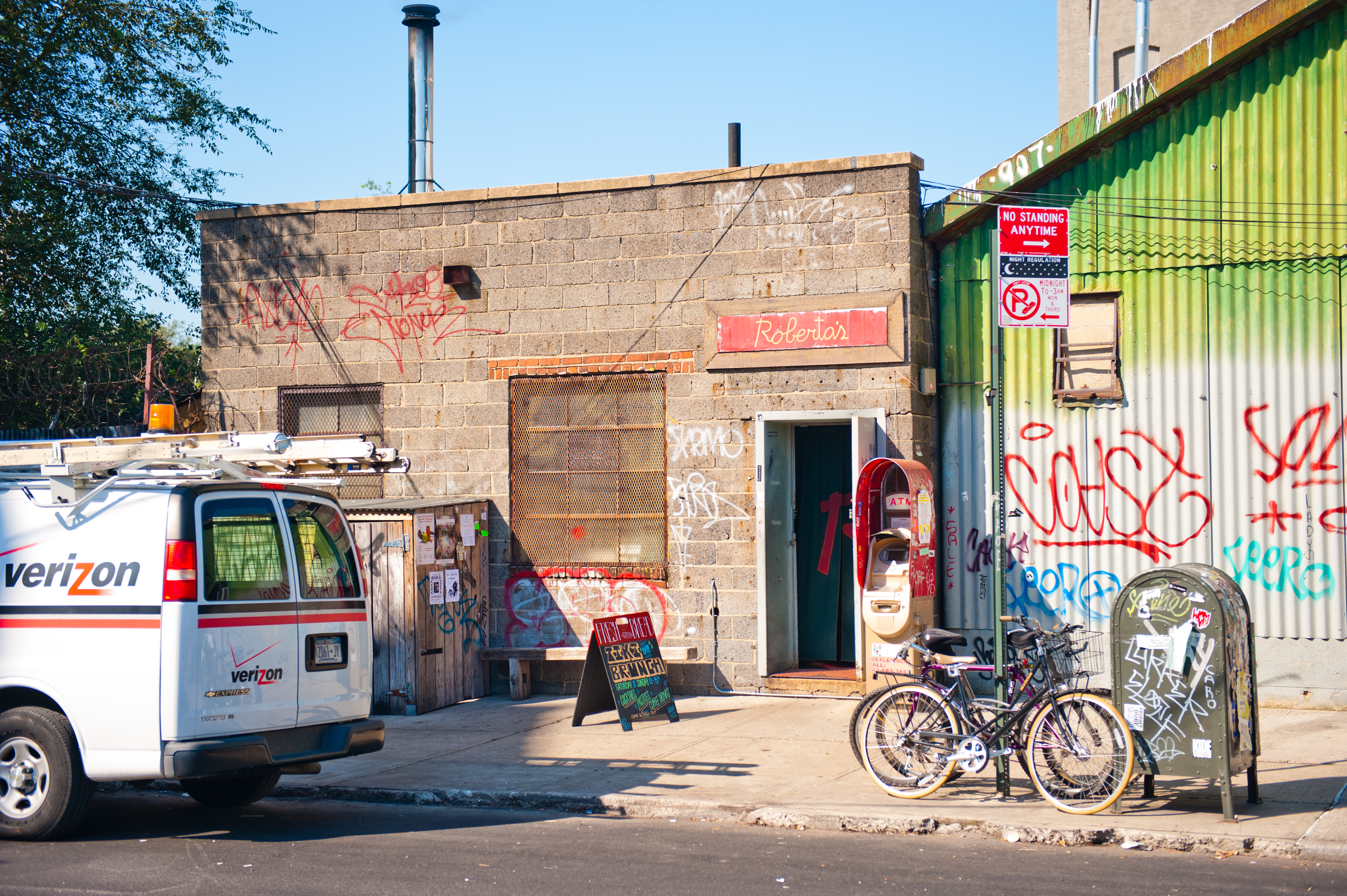
- The Bushwick location of Roberta's in October 2011.
- Interactive map of Roberta's

Restaurant information
- Established: January 2008
- Location: 261 Moore St, Brooklyn, New York, 11206, United States
- Coordinates: 40.704949°N 73.93344°W
- Website: robertaspizza.com

Roberta's is a New American pizzeria in Brooklyn, New York. Located in the neighborhood of East Williamsburg, it is known for its wood oven cooked pizza and hipster vibe. The restaurant serves pizza containing ingredients cooked from a rooftop garden, and houses a radio station in the rear of the building.

Roberta's has recently gained notoriety for its so-called "Tiki Disco" parties, which are thrown throughout Brooklyn, and in 2013 at the Bonnaroo Music Festival in Manchester, Tennessee. That same year, USA Today published a column from The Daily Meal which named Roberta's as one of America's top 15 pizzerias.

Roberta's opened a second location in Culver City, Los Angeles in September 2018 and a third in the old Domino Sugar Refinery in Williamsburg, Brooklyn in 2020.

== Notable events ==
In 2012 Roberta's hosted a private party for Democratic donor Susie Tompkins Buell, attended by former President Bill Clinton and Secretary of State Hillary Clinton. In December 2016, The New York Times reported that the restaurant received harassing phone calls that were connected to the Pizzagate conspiracy theory.

== See also ==
- List of New American restaurants
- List of restaurants in New York City
- Blanca - a restaurant located behind the pizzeria
