= David Seaman (writer) =

Commentator and conspiracy theorist

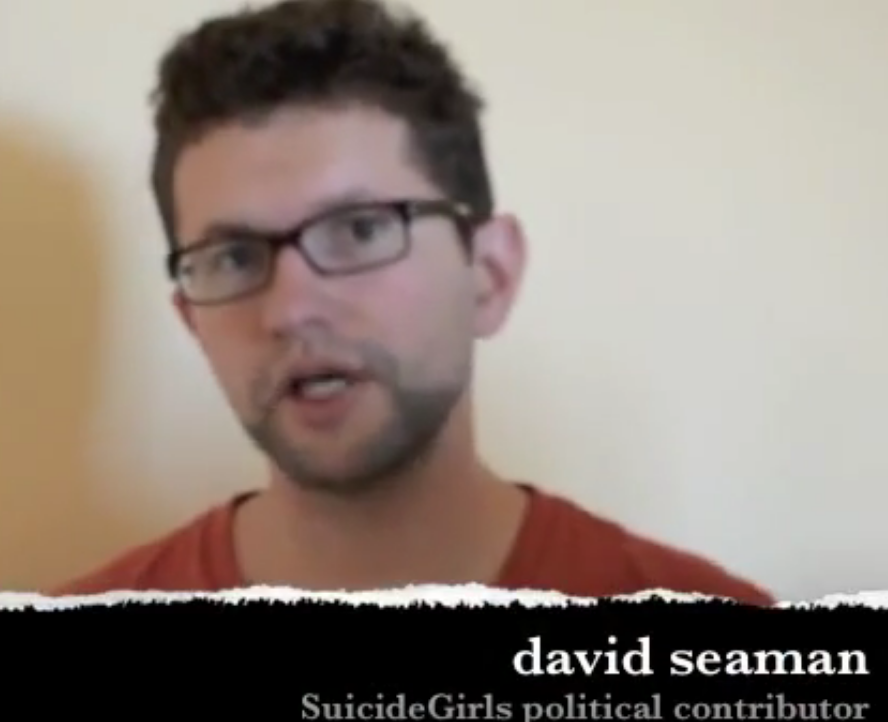
- Seaman in 2012
- Born: Maryland
- Occupations: Writer and conspiracy theorist

David Seaman is a conspiracist primarily known for his promotion of the Pizzagate conspiracy theory both during its initial furor and in subsequent years. Seaman wrote for various publications (including Jezebel, TheStreet.com, and The Huffington Post) while styling himself as a 'publicity expert.' By 2012, Seaman had shifted to a political orientation, launching a Libertarian senate campaign and expressing his views on the Joe Rogan Experience podcast. In 2016, Seaman was fired from his Huffpost columnist role for promoting conspiracist content, after which he became a major voice in the Pizzagate conspiracy community.

== Writing career ==
David worked as an intern for the women's magazine Jezebel. After this, Seaman pivoted to presenting himself as a self-promotion guru. After attending, but not graduating from New York University, Seaman published Dirty Little Secrets of Buzz: How to Attract Massive Attention to Your Business, Your Product, or Yourself, using those he describes as "publicity whores" to describe how to court virality, including anecdotes about Howard Stern, Tila Tequila, Ann Coulter, Bill Maher, and Donald Trump. While preparing the book in 2007, Seaman staged a "Free Paris Hilton" protest in which he attracted only three fellow protestors, but succeeded in entering the local tabloids, interviewing with Nancy Grace on CNN, and getting played off of on Jimmy Kimmel and Conan O'Brien's late-night shows. The incident led to Seaman's firing from his internship at Jezebel. Reflecting on Seaman's emergence on the conspiracy scene a decade later, Seaman's editor at the time, Moe Tkacik, expressed surprise at the path Seaman had taken, though noted that "his ideas were already bad and self-promotional" as of 2007.

Seaman later wrote for TheStreet.com, a financial news site. Following this, Seaman became involved in finance, credit, and cryptocurrencies, leading the development of a (now-defunct) Yelp for credit cards called CreditCardOutlaw.com and joining Cara Santa Maria on her podcast Talk Nerdy.

Inspired by his interest in traceless currencies, Seaman began opposing internet bills like the Stop Online Piracy Act (SOPA) and the Protect IP Act (PIPA) on the basis of privacy and internet freedom. Through these arguments, Seaman started a campaign against U.S. Representative Debbie Wasserman-Schultz, a key supporter of these bills. Seaman's congressional campaign led to his first invitation to guest on the Joe Rogan Experience podcast. Seaman guested a total of seven times on Rogan's podcast, where he largely discussed topics such as surveillance and bitcoin. When Rogan moved his podcast to the streaming platform Spotify, the episodes including Seaman were among the forty not included in the move.

== Conspiracy career ==
In late 2013, Seaman published an ebook titled All Your Favorite Conspiracy Theories Are Wrong. Seaman wrote for both Business Insider and then The Huffington Post in this period. However, The Huffington Post fired Seaman after he posted an article questioning Hillary Clinton's health, using a video by conspiracy theorist Paul Joseph Watson of InfoWars. Seaman said in 2017 that this termination led him to become involved with the Pizzagate conspiracy. At the time in 2016, Seaman's firing caused him to become something of a hero among the Reddit community /r/The_Donald, and he began producing videos critical of Hillary Clinton and the Democratic National Committee.

As of March 2017, Seaman's YouTube channel had over 150,000 subscribers, with content concentrating on a purported "satanic cabal of elites" in an alleged conspiracy with the government to traffic and rape small children. Between October 2016, the start of his Pizzagate content, and March 2017, Seaman's account accrued over 6 million views. At this time, Seaman deleted many older videos, saying he feared litigation. As of 2017, his videos tended to receive between fifty- and a hundred-thousand views, and he released more than a video a day. Alongside his YouTube presence, Seaman had nearly 70,000 Twitter followers as of 2017.

Seaman was denied use of the YouTube platform in February 2018, after which he moved his videos to BitChute, an alt-tech video streaming platform.

Between March 2017 and June 2018, Seaman launched a conservative news website, Fulcrum News, on which he was posting pro-Trump conspiracy theories as of June 2018.

== Relationship with outside groups ==
Seaman opposed QAnon believers and taunted QAnon fans following the anticlimactic release of the Office of the Inspector General report.

After Alex Jones apologized in March 2017 for his participation in the Pizzagate conspiracy, Seaman described Jones's withdrawal as a "disgrace." That same weekend, Seaman joined a national Pizzagate demonstration in Lafayette Square in front of the White House (attendance was a few dozen individuals), where he gave a speech about how he continues to believe in the theory.

On July 4, 2018, Fox News host Kimberly Guilfoyle was photographed with Seaman while he made a white nationalist-associated hand gesture. Seaman said that he is a fan of Guilfoyle, but that this was only a fan photograph, with no discussion of Pizzagate. Guilfoyle's spokesman said that this was one out of hundreds of photographs.
