= Angela Ruiz =

Venezuelan pageant titleholder (born 1992)

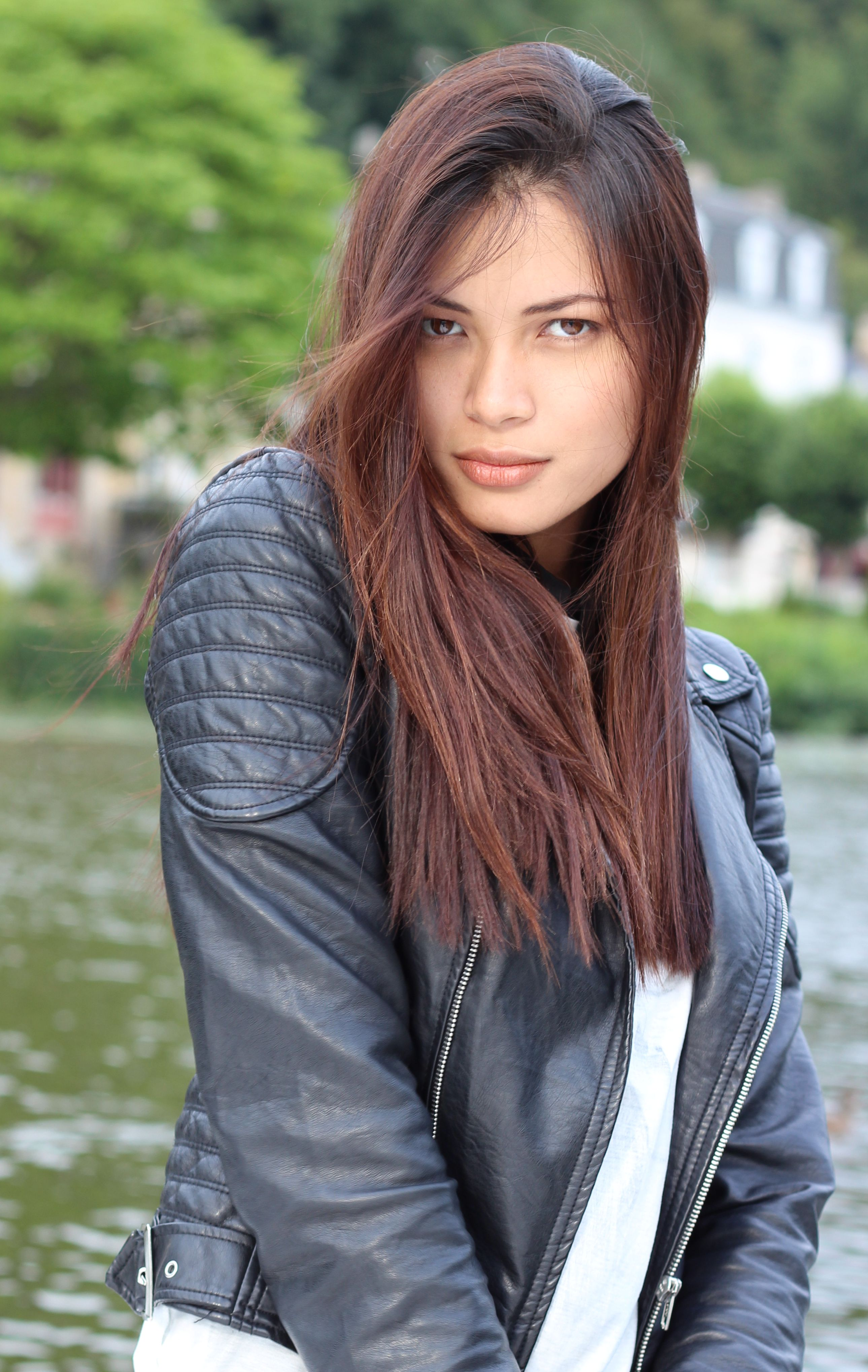
- Born: Ángela Julieta Ruiz Pérez; October 4, 1992 (age 34); Maturín, Venezuela
- Known for: Elite Model Look Latino Venezuela 2008 (Winner); Super Model of Venezuela 2009 (Winner); Miss Venezuela 2010 (1st Runner-Up); Reinado Internacional del Café 2011 (1st Runner-Up); Reina Hispanoamericana 2011 (5th Runner-Up)
- Modeling information
- Height: 5 ft 11 in (1.80 m)
- Hair color: Black
- Eye color: Hazel
- Agency: Brand Model Management (mother agency); Wilhelmina Models; Storm Model Management; Monster Management Milan; Oui Management Paris; Sight Management Barcelona; Model Management Hamburg
- Website: angelajmodelo.perso.sfr.fr

Ángela Julieta Ruiz Pérez (born October 4, 1992 in Maturín) is a Venezuelan model and beauty pageant titleholder who represented Monagas in the Miss Venezuela 2010 pageant, on October 28, 2010, and won the title of 1st runner up.

Ruiz won the Super Model of Venezuela 2009 pageant and was the official representative of Venezuela in the Ford Models Supermodel of the World 2010 pageant, held in Brazil in January, 2010.

On the same time she graduated as an industrial engineer at the Santiago Marino's University, in 2011.

She also represented Venezuela in the Reinado Internacional del Café 2011, in Manizales, Colombia, on January 9, 2011, and won the title of Virreina (Vice-Miss or 1st runner up).

Ruiz has also been named 5th runner up in the 2011 Reina Hispanoamericana pageant in Santa Cruz, Bolivia, on October, 27th, 2011.

During those years she continued to work as a model in Venezuela, did different campaigns for various brands, as many runways for Venezuelan designers, commercials on TV for Gillette (brand) and Ferrara Grupo, among others.

After being discovered by BrandModel Management, she was contracted by Wilhelmina Models New York in 2012. After different runways for the New York Fashion Weeks for designers such as Pamella Roland, Desigual, Venexiana, Angel Sanchez, Rafael Cennamo, Tracy Reese, J.Crew, presentations for Ralph Lauren and Guess, she made a commercial for L'Oréal Paris with the international star Beyoncé Knowles and made the last campaign of Timberland Company 2015. She also works for the Olay Regenerist Campaign, as well as Matrix, Revlon, Abercrombie and Fitch, OPI Products Hawaii.

She is also followed by Monster Management Milan, where Angela made a campaign for Yamamay as Intimissimi lingerie. Storm Model Management London, Oui Management in Paris, Sight Management in Barcelona, where she works for the last Desigual campaign Winter 2014. And She is followed by Model Management in Hamburg. In April 2016 it appears in the cover of Elle Portugal, in addition in special editions of Vogue India, GQ, among others.
