= Comet Ping Pong =

Pizzeria in Washington, D.C.

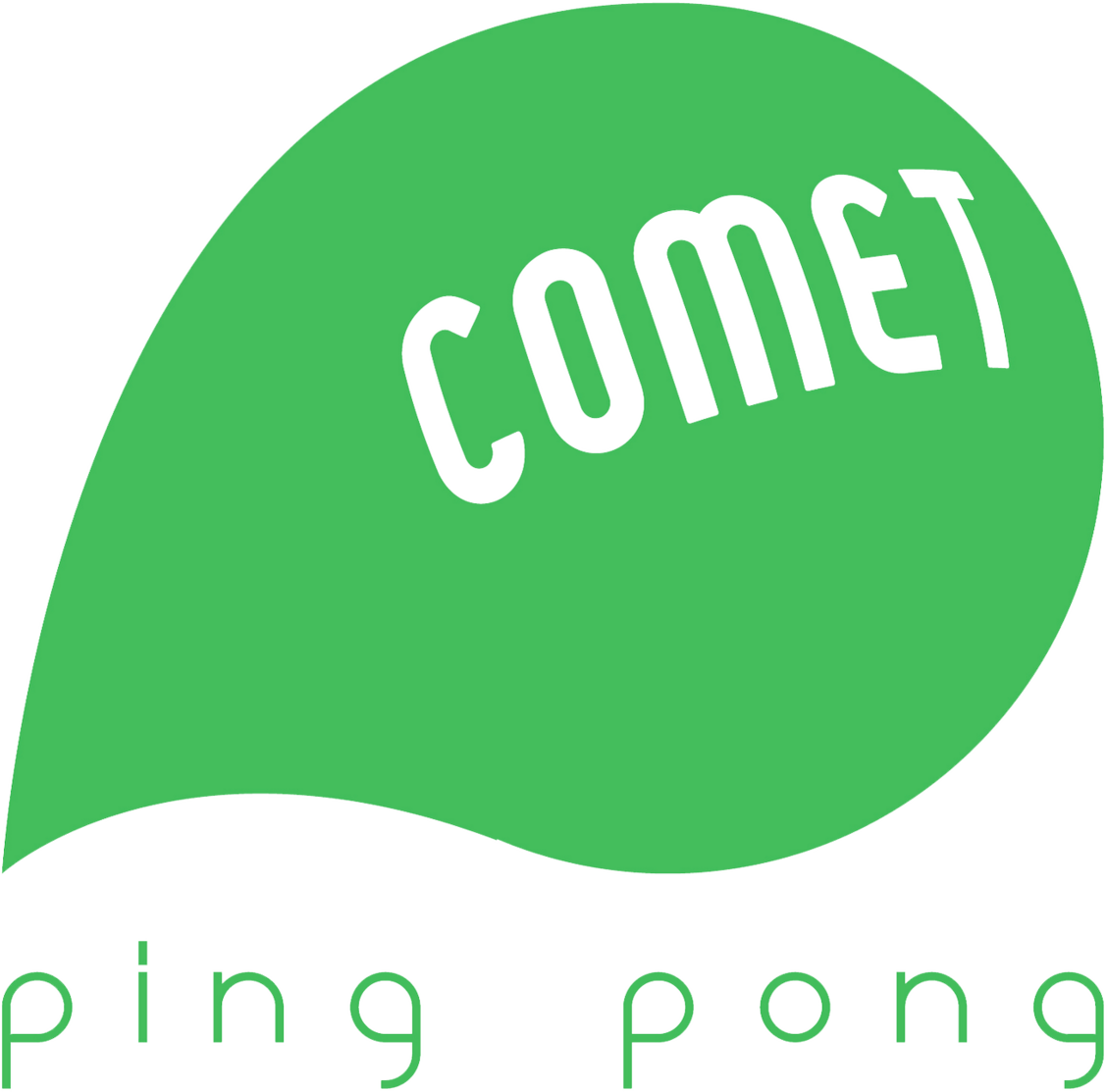

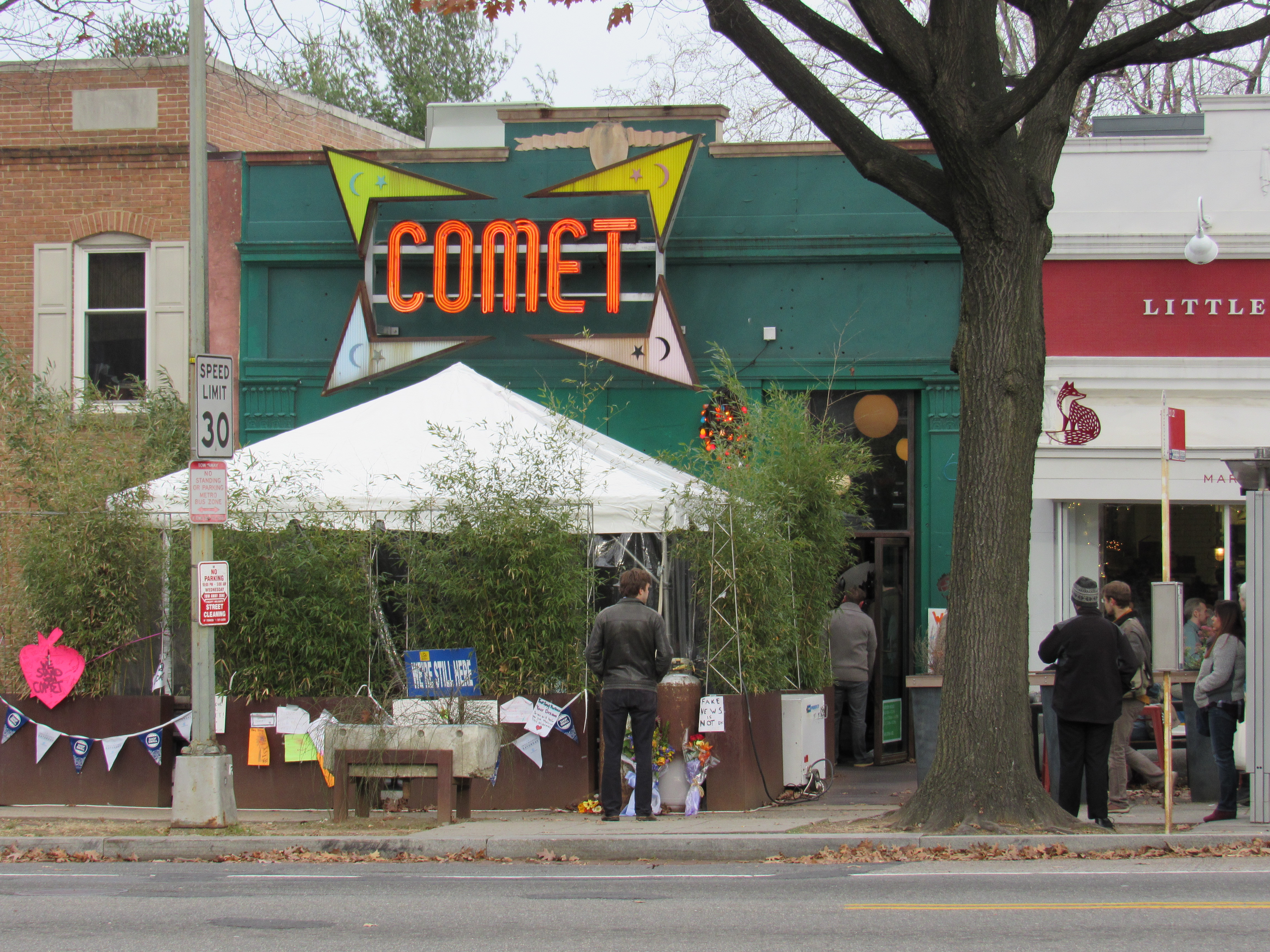
- Comet Ping Pong in 2016
- Interactive map of Comet Ping Pong

Restaurant information
- Established: October 2006
- Owner: James Alefantis
- Food type: Pizza
- Dress code: Casual
- Location: 5037 Connecticut Avenue NW, Washington, D.C., 20008, United States
- Coordinates: 38.955917°N 77.070038°W
- Website: cometpingpong.com

Comet Ping Pong (often abbreviated as Comet) is a pizzeria, restaurant, and concert venue located on Connecticut Avenue in Washington, D.C.'s Chevy Chase neighborhood. Owned by James Alefantis, Comet has received critical acclaim from The Washington Post, The Washingtonian, New York magazine, the DCist, and Guy Fieri of Food Network's Diners, Drive-Ins and Dives.

Comet was founded in 2006 by Alefantis and Carole Greenwood, both of whom also co-owned another restaurant on the same block. The restaurant was involved in a disagreement with the area's Advisory Neighborhood Commission over concerts inside the restaurant in 2008. Alefantis became the sole owner of Comet Ping Pong in 2009 after Greenwood, a chef at both restaurants, left her position as co-owner and executive chef of Comet.

The restaurant is the focus of the Pizzagate conspiracy theory, which has been discredited by a wide variety of organizations, including the Metropolitan Police Department of the District of Columbia. One Pizzagate activist fired a gun in the restaurant in 2016, and another started a fire in it in 2019. In 2020, the restaurant temporarily closed due to the COVID-19 pandemic before reopening afterwards.

== History ==
=== Founding ===
Comet Ping Pong was founded by James Alefantis and Carole Greenwood in 2006. Prior to opening Comet Ping Pong, Alefantis and Greenwood co-owned Buck's Fishing and Camping, another restaurant next door to Comet's current location. The location of Comet was previously occupied by another restaurant, Thai Room. When it was announced that it was closing, Alefantis decided that he would rather be competing against himself than another restaurateur. The original idea for the space was to make a restaurant devoted to roast chicken called "The Hen House", but Alefantis and Greenwood decided against it and made the location a pizzeria instead. The name came from a neon "Comet" sign that Alefantis found at Comet Liquor in the city's Adams Morgan neighborhood.

After Alefantis purchased the location, the DC architecture firm CORE redesigned the space by removing most of the features from the building and making it more "raw". Because the location was next door to their other restaurant, Alefantis and Greenwood merged both restaurants' kitchens so they could easily move back and forth between the locations. Alefantis and Greenwood were inspired by New Haven-style pizza in the menu's creation. Initially, Comet Ping Pong faced challenges: patrons complained that the pizzas were too expensive and that its salad selection was too small. The restaurant changed its menu and was able to find a niche in the gourmet pizza market in the D.C. area. Greenwood served as the chef of both restaurants; she left her position as executive chef and co-owner in 2009 citing urgent family matters and other personal interests. The Washington City Paper's Tim Carman in 2009 felt that both Comet and Buck's Fishing & Camping had managed to succeed without Greenwood.

=== Local government issues ===
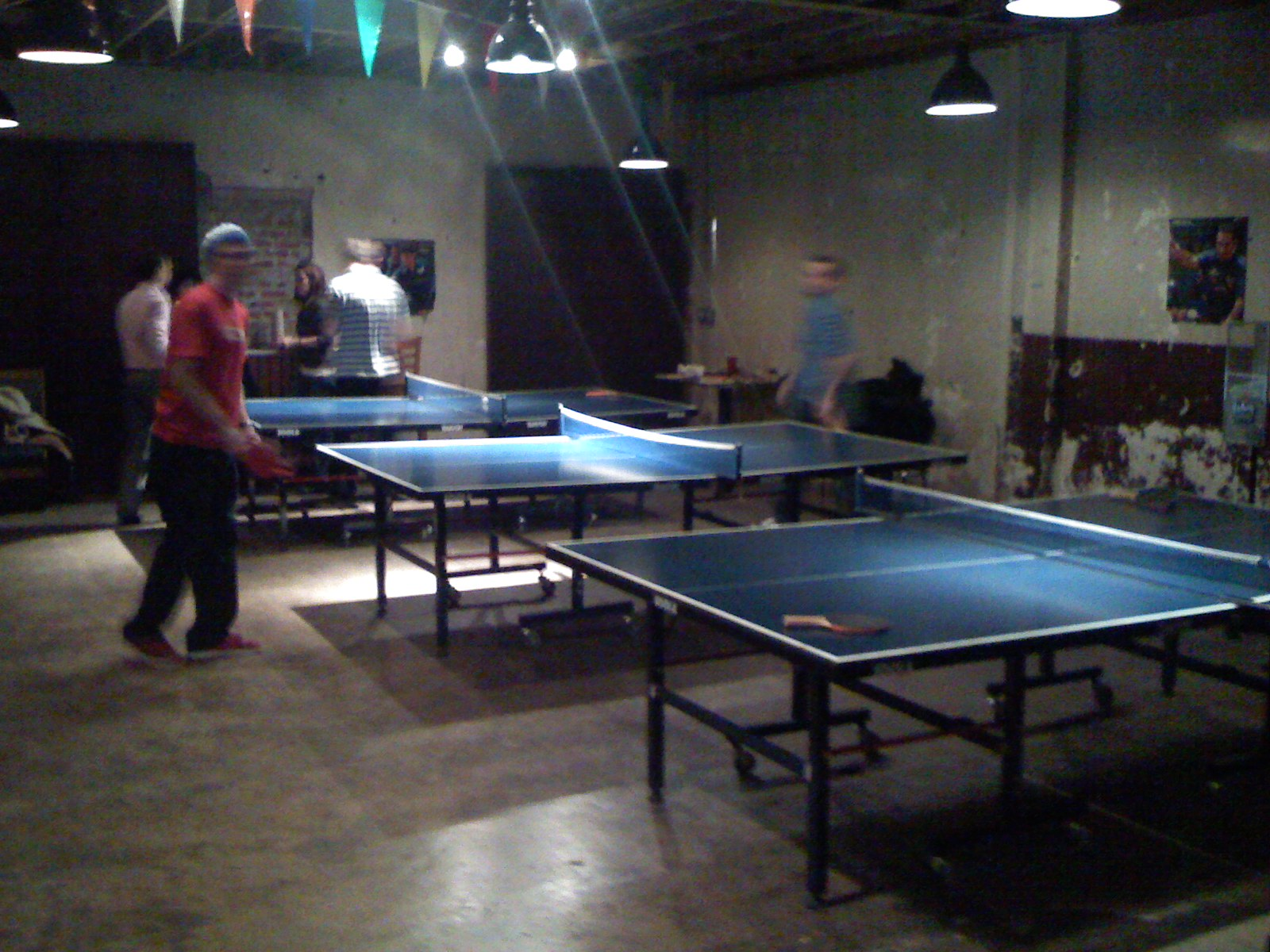
Ping pong games are played inside the restaurant.

When Comet Ping Pong opened in October 2006, Alefantis made a voluntary agreement with the local Advisory Neighborhood Commission (ANC) and the Alcoholic Beverage Control Board that the restaurant "would not stay open past midnight or have live entertainment." By 2008, however, the restaurant was hosting live music events and some neighborhood residents complained that the business was open after midnight. Additionally, Advisory Neighborhood Commissioner Frank Winstead criticized Alefantis for having placed a ping pong table on the sidewalk in front of the restaurant to attract and entertain customers. Winstead published a video on YouTube, "Ping Pong in Public Space", which showed people playing ping pong outside the restaurant and implied that the situation was a traffic hazard. Anticipating that he was going to request outside seating, Alefantis brought the table indoors. Alefantis held a meeting with the local ANC board to formally request that it allow Comet to place outside seating, have live entertainment in the restaurant, and remain open after midnight. The meeting was acrimonious, with some ANC members accusing Alefantis of violating the agreement and holding live entertainment in the venue. Winstead stated that Alefantis was "trying to turn this area into Adams Morgan with the murders and rapes." The ANC decided in Comet's favor by a 4–3 vote and the audio recording of the meeting went public. Live music resumed on August 8, 2008, after the decision, and Winstead was defeated by a wide margin in the next election.

=== Pizzagate conspiracy theory ===
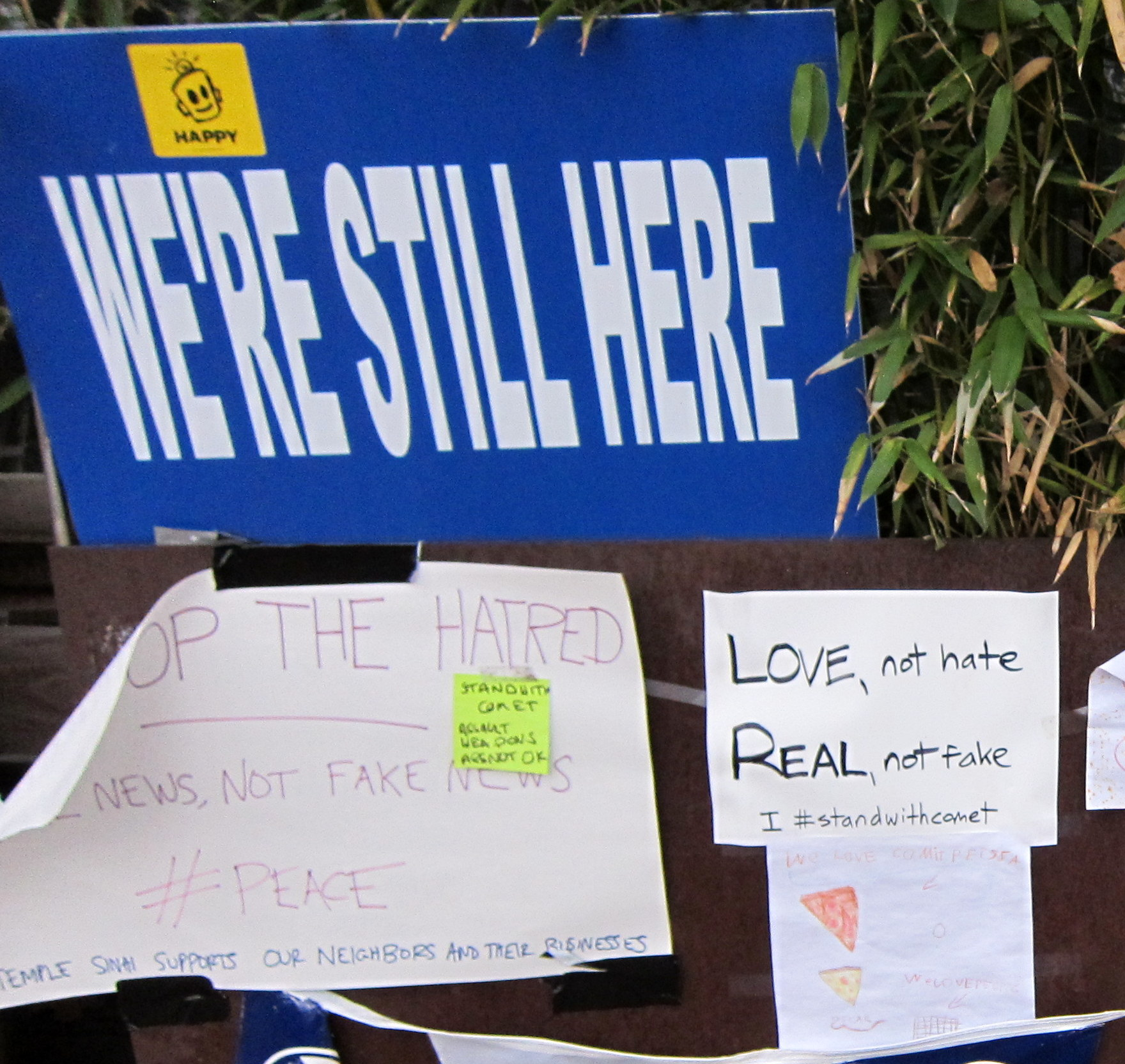
Community messages in front of Comet Ping Pong following the shooting

In early November 2016, several websites and online forums falsely implicated Comet Ping Pong and various Democratic Party figures as part of a supposed child trafficking ring, which was dubbed "Pizzagate" on Internet forums. The rumor was debunked by the Metropolitan Police Department of the District of Columbia and sources such as Snopes.com and The New York Times, among others. However, the restaurant's owners and staff were harassed, threatened on social media websites, and given negative Yelp reviews. After continued threats, Comet Ping Pong increased the security for concerts held inside its premises.

On December 4, 2016, Edgar Maddison Welch of Salisbury, North Carolina, walked into the restaurant with a semi-automatic rifle and fired three rounds inside the building before being arrested; no one was injured. In addition to the AR-15-style rifle, police seized a Colt .38 caliber handgun, a shotgun, and a folding knife from Welch's car and person. Welch told police that he planned to "self-investigate" the conspiracy theory, and was charged with assault with a dangerous weapon, carrying a pistol without a license, unlawful discharge of a firearm, and carrying a rifle or shotgun outside the home or business. On June 22, 2017, he was sentenced to four years in prison. On March 3, 2020, Welch was transferred to a Community Corrections Center (CCC) and was released on May 28. On January 6, 2025, Welch was shot and killed by police after pointing a firearm at a police officer during a traffic stop in Kannapolis, North Carolina.

The day after the shooting, Alefantis met with the restaurant staff and decided to keep the restaurant open: customers lined up and down the block for its first dinner shift after it reopened, with many bringing signs and flowers of support. In response to the 2016 shooting, the restaurant set up a GoFundMe campaign to compensate for additional security, lost wages, and property damage. On Facebook, a local PR consultant set up an event to support the restaurant and nearby businesses affected by the harassment campaign, which thousands of people expressed interest in attending. During the sentencing hearing for the gunman, then-U.S. District Judge Ketanji Brown Jackson stressed that Welch's actions "literally left psychological wreckage." An arsonist set a fire in the restaurant in January 2019. The fire was quickly put out by restaurant employees and caused no injuries. A man suspected to be the arsonist was later arrested and pleaded guilty at court in December 2019. The restaurant continued to be targeted by believers of Pizzagate into the 2020s, with one person jamming the restaurant's phone line for one day. Alefantis noted in 2025 that Comet Ping Pong still receives anonymous calls about the conspiracy theory at the restaurant.

== Services and reputation ==
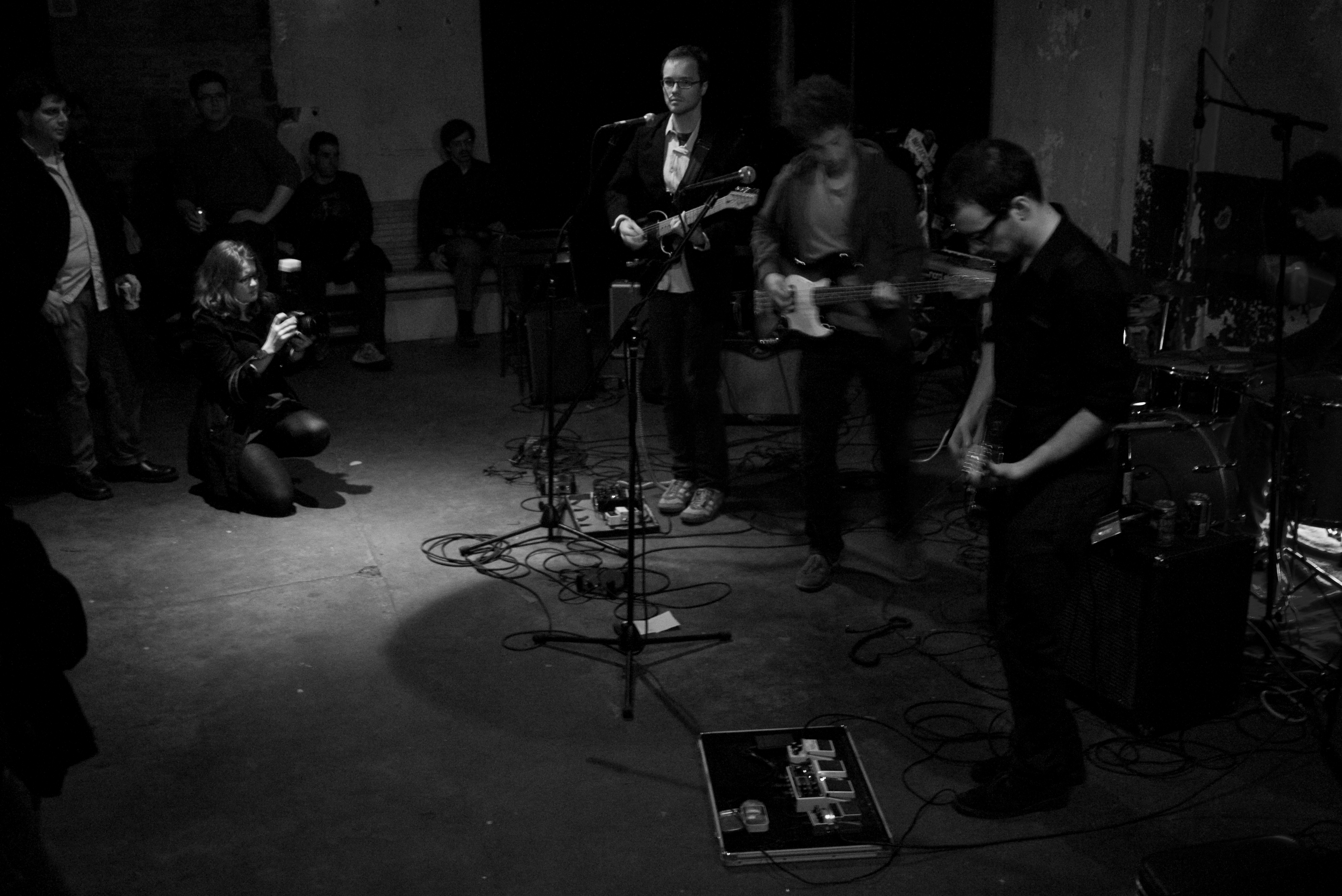
A band performs in Comet Ping Pong's back room.

Comet Ping Pong is both a pizzeria and a live concert venue. The Washington Post's food critic, Tom Sietsema, gave Comet two and a half stars out of four, noting that its pizzas "are as good for their thin and yeasty crusts as for their toppings." The Washingtonian placed the restaurant in the "top tier" of Washington pizzerias. New York magazine featured Comet in its "Where to Eat" section of a "Navigating the Potomac" feature, describing the restaurant as a "hipster-heavy pizza parlor". The DCist featured Comet Ping Pong's 'Time-Out' pizza as one of the ten best in the area. The restaurant also appeared on an episode of Food Network's Diners, Drive-Ins and Dives with Guy Fieri in 2010 in which he called the Yalie clam and the Philly calzone pizzas some of the "best he's ever had".

GQ ranked James Alefantis as the 49th most powerful person in Washington, partly on the basis of owning Comet Ping Pong and its cultural cachet. Ping pong tables populate the back room, which serves as Comet's concert venue and features a stage at nearly ground level. A number of artists and bands have performed at the restaurant, including The Apes, Speedy Ortiz, and Tussle. DCist's Mehan Jayasuriya noted of the venue, "It's not often that, on your way into a punk rock show, you have to carefully skirt around the band members, for fear of interrupting their ping-pong match."
