= James Alefantis =

American chef and restaurateur

James Alefantis is an American chef, restaurateur, gallerist, entrepreneur, and Tony Award-winning Broadway producer. He founded and owns four restaurants in Washington, D.C.: Comet Ping Pong, Buck's Fishing & Camping, Muchas Gracias, and Honeys & Friends. He is the Board President Emeritus of Transformer, an art gallery in Logan Circle, Washington, D.C. In 2012, GQ named him as being one of the 50 most powerful people in Washington, D.C.

== Career ==
Alefantis grew up in and resides in Washington, D.C. He founded a contemporary art gallery called Strand on Volta, located in Georgetown. He founded Buck's Fishing & Camping in October 2003 with Carole Greenwood as the first chef. In 2006, he opened Comet Ping Pong, which also operates as a live music venue. In April 2020, Alefantis opened Muchas Gracias, a latin restaurant in Washington, D.C. In 2025, he opened Honeys & Friends, an ice cream and wine shop in Washington, D.C. that also serves as a private events space.

== Personal life ==
Alefantis is openly gay. He formerly dated David Brock, the CEO of Media Matters for America.

== Pizzagate Conspiracy Theory ==
In 2016, Comet Ping Pong and Alefantis became mired in an online conspiracy theory known as Pizzagate. Alefantis penned a Washington Post op-ed in 2017 thanking his community for their support.
