= Caroline Medina =

Venezuelan beauty queen (born 1992)

- Born: Caroline Gabriela Medina Peschiutta; June 27, 1992 (age 34); Maracay, Aragua, Venezuela
- Height: 1.78 m (5 ft 10 in)
- Beauty pageant titleholder
- Title: Miss Venezuela Earth 2010; Miss Earth - Fire 2011
- Hair color: Dark Blonde
- Eye color: Hazel
- Major competitions: Teen Model Venezuela 2009 (Winner); Miss Venezuela 2010 (Miss Venezuela Earth); Reina Hispanoamericana 2010 (Winner); Miss Earth 2011 (Miss Earth – Fire)

Caroline Gabriela Medina Peschiutta (born June 27, 1992 in Maracay) is a Venezuelan model and beauty pageant titleholder who won the titles of Teen Model Venezuela 2009, Miss Venezuela Earth 2010, Reina Hispanoamericana 2010 and Miss Earth - Fire 2011.

== Beauty pageant competitions ==
Medina represented the state of Aragua in the national beauty pageant Miss Venezuela 2010, on October 28, 2010, and obtained the title of Miss Venezuela Earth 2010. She won as "Miss Earth - Fire" in the 2011 Miss Earth pageant in the Philippines. Medina won the Reina Hispanoamericana 2010 pageant, in Santa Cruz (Bolivia), on November 4, 2010. On August 6, 2009, Medina also won the "Teen Model Venezuela 2009" pageant in Caracas (Venezuela).

Awards and achievements
Preceded by (Venezuela) Adriana Vasini	Reina Hispanoamericana; 2010	Succeeded by (Curaçao) Evalina Van Putten
Preceded by (United States) Yeidy Bosques	Miss Earth-Fire; 2011	Succeeded by (Brazil) Camila Brant
Preceded by Mariángela Bonanni	Miss Earth Venezuela; 2010	Succeeded by Osmariel Villalobos
