= DrossRotzank =

Venezuelan-Argentine YouTuber and writer (born 1982)

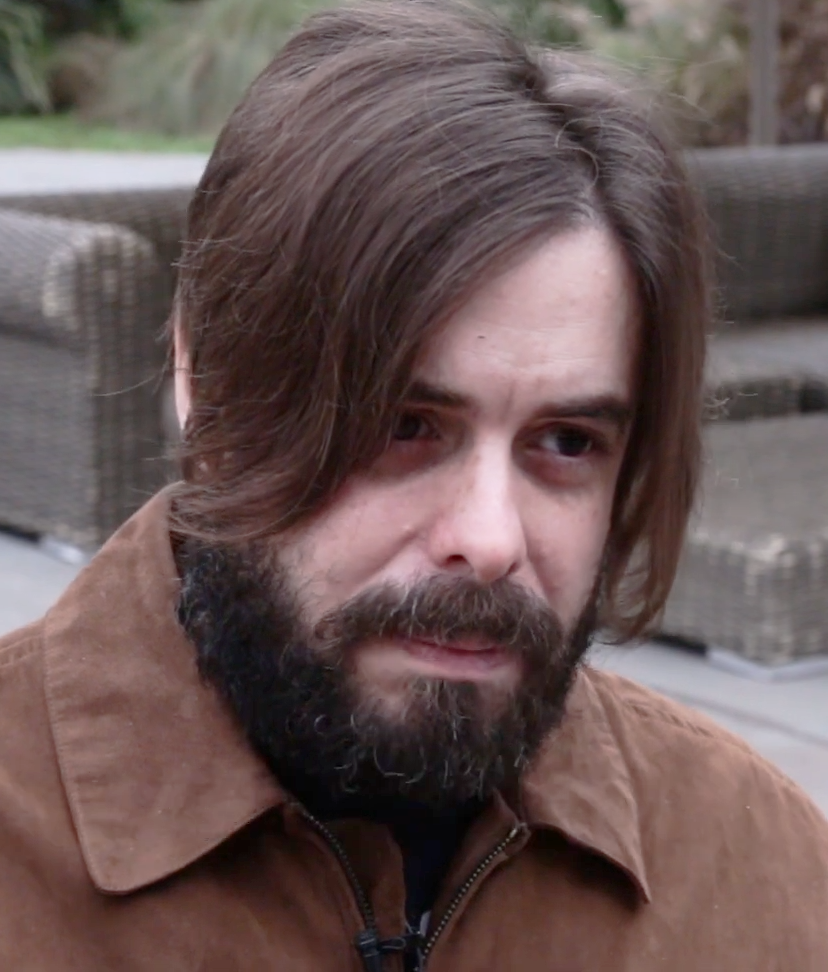
- DrossRotzank in 2019
- Born: Ángel David Revilla Lenoci; 16 July 1982 (age 44); Caracas, Venezuela
- Other name: Dross
- Citizenship: Venezuela; Argentina
- Education: Universidad Santa María (Lic.)
- Occupations: YouTuber; writer

YouTube information
- Channels: DrossRotzank; Los Vlogs de Dross; Mi Querido Mussolini
- Genres: Black comedy (2006–2013); Horror (2013–present)
- Subscribers: 24 million (DrossRotzank); 3.2 million (Los Vlogs de Dross); 467 thousand (Mi Querido Mussolini)
- Views: 7 billion (DrossRotzank); 216 million (Los Vlogs de Dross); 13.3 million (Mi Querido Mussolini)
- Last updated: 12 May 2025

Signature
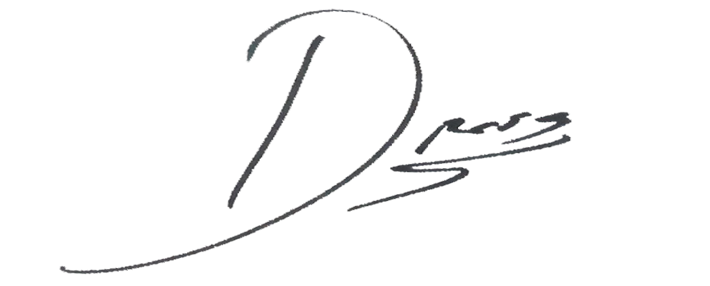

Ángel David Revilla Lenoci (born 16 July 1982), better known as DrossRotzank or simply Dross, is a Venezuelan YouTuber and writer who has resided in Buenos Aires, Argentina, since 2007.

== Early life ==
Ángel David Revilla Lenoci was born on 16 July 1982 in Caracas. His father was a pilot and his mother was a gastronomy-oriented businesswoman. His ancestry comes from Spain, Italy, and United States. He studied at Universidad Santa María, and graduated from Social Communication in 2007 and also worked as a journalist for a medical magazine.

In 1998 created the blog entitled El Diario de Dross (The Diary of Dross), whose username "Dross" originates due to a bad spelling of the name of the then wrestler Darren Drozdov, whom Revilla mistakenly refers to as «Warren Droz» in an interview with Radio Programas del Perú. Revilla started in 2000 writing scathing game reviews for websites like MeriStation or Vandal, he also made some posts in the forum GameFAQs.

== Career ==
=== YouTube career ===
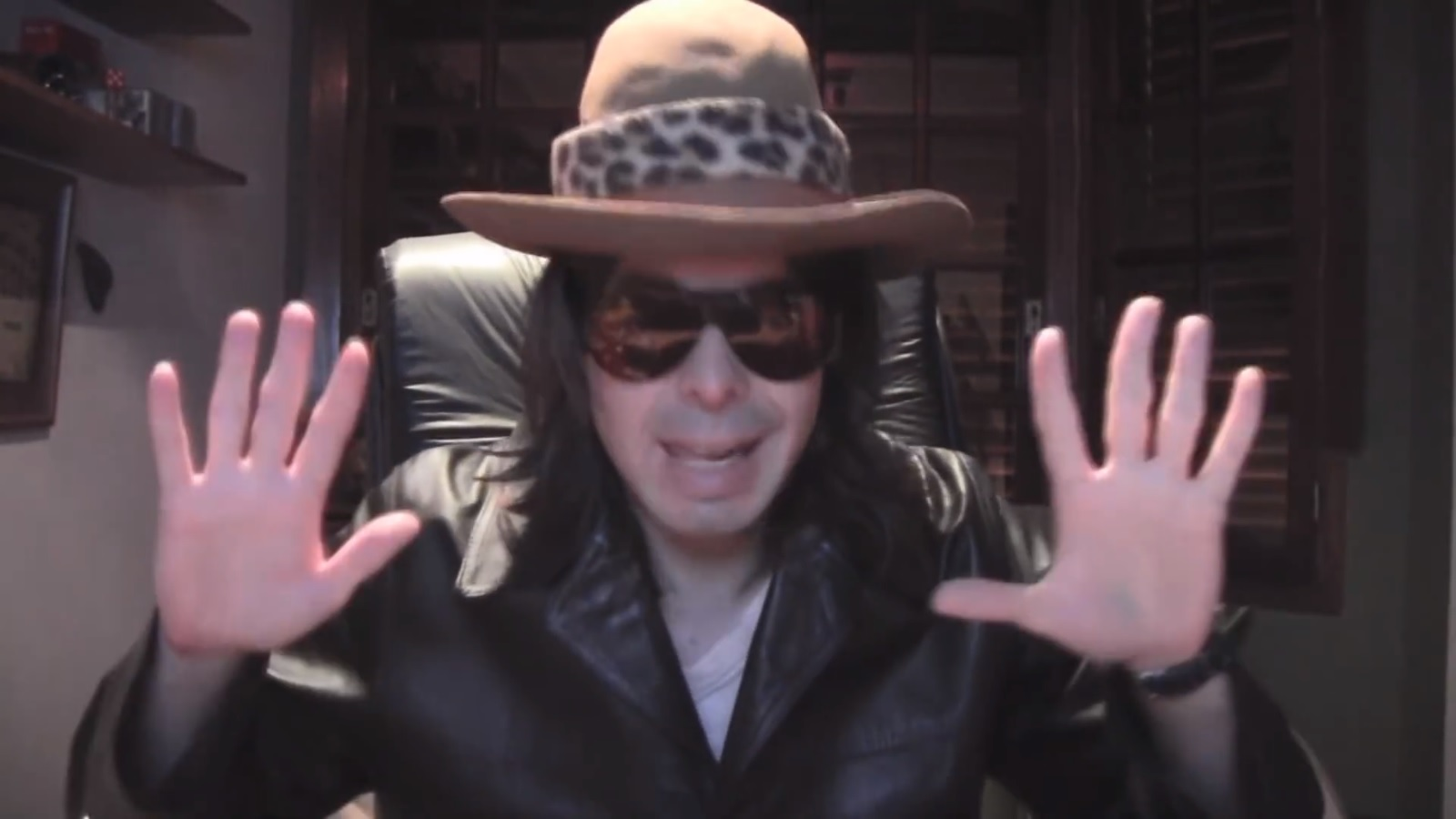
Capture of the video "Dross te contesta 12" (Dross answers 12), uploaded on January 22, 2012

Revilla created his YouTube account, DrossRotzank in 2006, and in 2007, he moved to Buenos Aires, Argentina, where he currently resides. At first he was dedicated to uploading gameplays of different video games such as I Wanna Be the Guy. However, Dross had some videos that were older that in the end he deleted, among them is one that was re-uploaded by user Lucas Pedraza in which he calls a hacker.

In addition, he made some video reactions, videos answering questions and also some sketches with his characters like "El Troll", "La Gorda", "La Chica Pepsi", "Estela Conchaseca" and "Fuyito Kokoyama". His look consisted of wearing long hair, dark glasses and a straw hat with a leopard print.

In mid-2013, he turned his content to horror videos, and his most famous videos were the Top 7, which according to La Vanguardia, these videos "can take him twelve hours of work." In 2015, Dross participated in a project called "Dross Dark Tales of Terror", where he told contemporary horror stories. Revilla currently runs two additional YouTube channels: Los Vlogs de Dross (Dross's Vlogs), in which he deals with controversial issues, and Mi Querido Mussolini ("My Dear Mussolini"), in which he uploads videos of his pet fish, Mussolini.

In March 2017, Dross was invited to the La Mole Comic Con event, which took place at the World Trade Center in Mexico City and which was dedicated to pop culture and Japanese culture. He participated in three meet & greet sessions, on March 17, 18 and 19. Revilla traveled to the Horror Fest, held in the city of Monterrey, Mexico on October 6 and 7, 2018. In 2018 and 2019, he won in the Digital Artist and Digital Vision Award categories from Martín Fierro Awards. In 2020, he exceeded 20 million subscribers. At the beginning of 2021, Dross lent his voice to a Manjarate commercial for the Chilean company Soprole, distributed through the Internet and Chilean television channels. In December 2021, he won again in the category Best YouTuber of the Martín Fierro Awards.

=== Writing career ===
In 2015, he was invited to the YouTube Media Fest in Buenos Aires, where he stated during a question and answer session that "the biggest dream of my life is to publish a book". The people from Grupo Planeta decided to speak with him to make and publish his first novel, Luna de Plutón (Pluto's Moon). It was released in Spain and Latin America in 2015, and it became one of the ten best-selling Argentine books in a few weeks. David reported in Clarín magazine that he "wrote this book with my real name, Ángel Revilla, but I know that Luna de Plutón has drama, mystery, suspense, adventure, everything that Dross has. Above all the normal humor of my channel, black humor."

All his books from Luna de Plutón to Escape were published by Grupo Planeta. His second book, El Festival de la Blasfemia (The Festival of Blasphemy) was released in 2016, "a short story of terror, narrated from the black humor characteristic of Dross", a sequel to his first book, Luna de Plutón II: La guerra de Ysaak (Pluto's moon 2: The war of Ysaak), was released in March 2017.

His fourth book, El Valle de la Calma (The Valley of Calm), was published in 2018, a thriller based on H. P. Lovecraft works. In 2019, he released El libro negro. Deep web y horror cósmico (The black book. Deep web and cosmic horror), which explores the topics of the Deep Web and cosmic horror. It was the best-selling book in some countries of The Americas, like Argentina from August 25 to September 1, 2019. In September 2021, he wrote Escape, a book with a disturbing story and black humor.

== Controversies ==
Dross' Internet career has been largely marked by controversy because of his outspoken attitude, especially regarding politics. He is largely opposed to the Chavism, the government of his native Venezuela under Hugo Chávez and Nicolás Maduro. He has constantly mocked Chavist personalities such as Chávez himself, Maduro, Diosdado Cabello, and Mario Silva. During the 2024 Venezuelan political crisis, Dross expressed his hatred towards Maduro by saying "I hope that he ends up with a stick buried in his ass. I have absolutely no commiseration in saying that I wish him the worst, because he is a murderer and a genocidal". Dross also states that should he return to Venezuela under the Maduro government, he would be arrested and sent to El Helicoide.

In June 2022, Dross criticized the film Lightyear for containing a scene depicting a lesbian couple kissing, accusing Disney of "trying to clean its image" and calling the film "woke", polarizing the internet, receiving backlash on social media as a result while others agreeing with his criticism to the company. Shortly thereafter, he made a tweet about The Little Mermaid, in a tone in what many saw as racist and xenophobic.

In August 2023, Dross attracted controversy after posting a tweet that depicted the desecration of the pride flag. The post was reported from Germany for allegedly violating the country's social media regulations. However, Twitter determined that the post did not breach either the platform's rules or German law. In response, Dross jokingly commented, "Calm down, little Adolfs". Despite criticism from some users who considered the tweet offensive to the LGBTQ community, Dross has stated in the past that he identifies as pansexual.

== Awards and nominations ==
Martín Fierro Awards

Year	Category	Result
2018	Digital Artist	Won
2019	Digital Vision Award	Won
2020	Best YouTuber	Won

== Filmography ==
Year	Title	Role
2006	Voces anónimas	Storyteller (2013–present)
2015	Dross Dark Tales of Terror	Storyteller

== Works ==
- (2015) Luna de Plutón. Planeta. ISBN 978-950-730-096-7.
- (2016) Festival de la blasfemia. Planeta. ISBN 978-950-730-113-1.
- (2017) Luna de Plutón II: La guerra de Ysaak. Planeta. ISBN 978-950-730-152-0.
- (2018) El Valle de la Calma. Planeta. ISBN 978-950-730-206-0.
- (2019) El libro negro. Deep web y horror cósmico. Planeta. ISBN 978-950-870-153-4.
- (2021) Escape. Planeta. ISBN 950-870-18-46.
