= Reinado Internacional del Café 2011 =

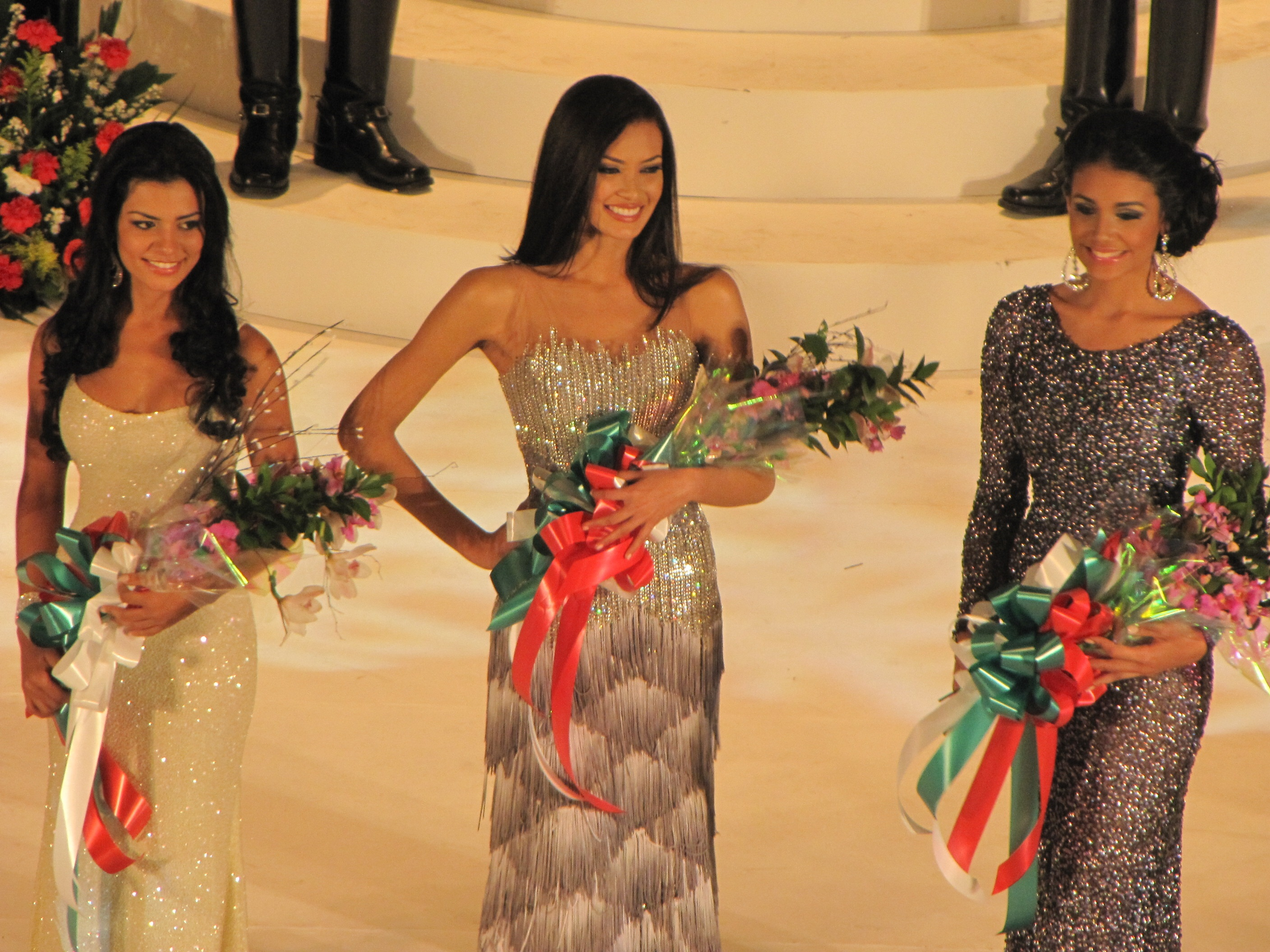
The three finalists at Reinado Internacional del Café 2011. From left to right, Colombia - Jenny Marcela Arias, Venezuela - Angela Ruiz, Dominican Republic - Sofinel Báez.

Reinado Internacional del Café 2011 beauty pageant, was held in Manizales, Colombia, on January 9, 2011. There were 22 participants. The winner was Sofinel Báez, from the Dominican Republic.

== Results ==
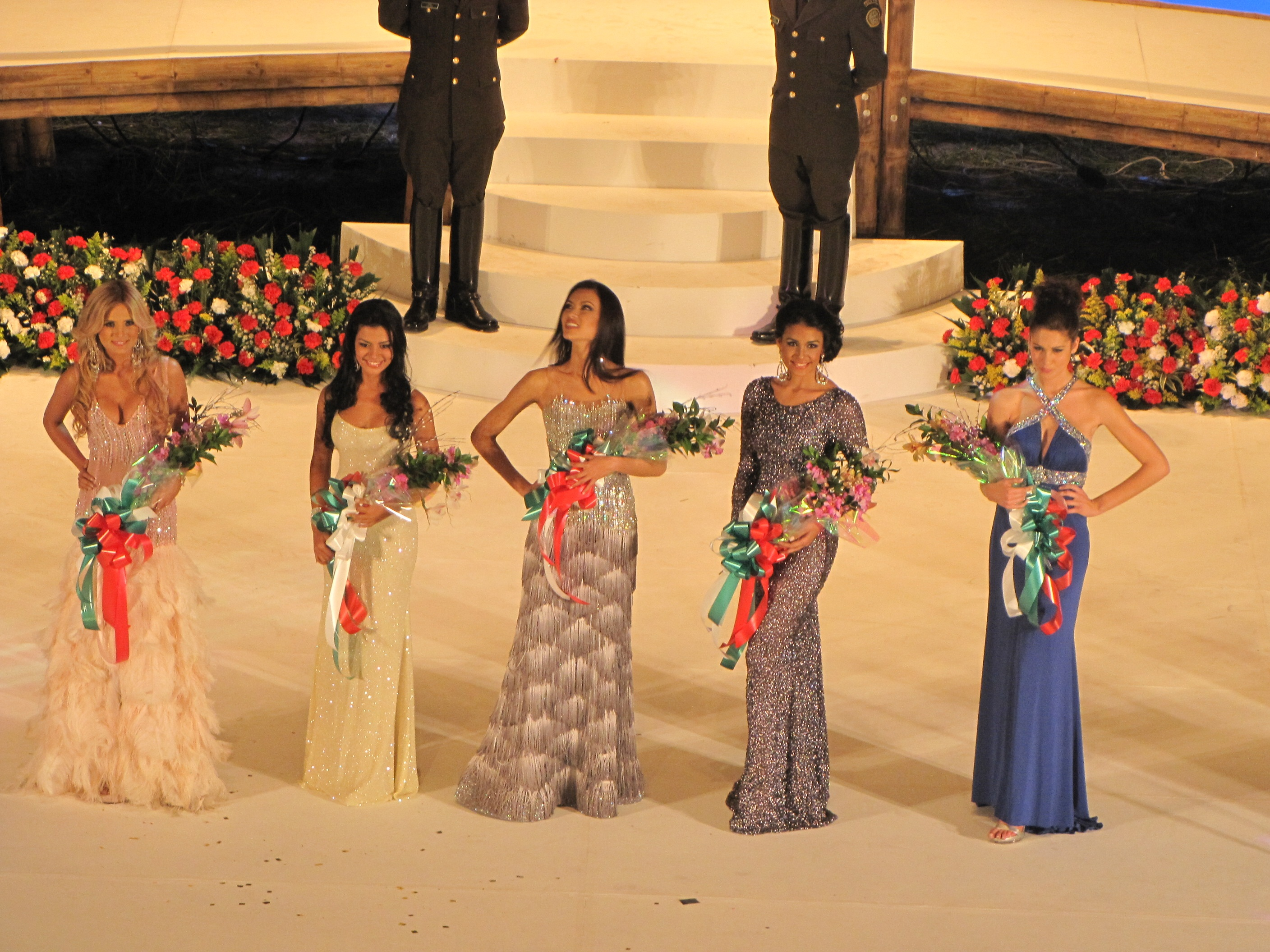
The five finalists at Reinado Internacional del Café 2011: From left to right, Bolivia - María Teresa Roca, Colombia - Jenny Marcela Arias, Venezuela - Angela Ruiz, Dominican Republic - Sofinel Báez, Spain - Ana Isabel Miranda.

=== Placements ===
| Final results | Contestant |
|---|---|
| Reina Internacional del Café 2011 | Dominican Republic - Sofinel Báez |
| Virreina Internacional del Café 2011 | Venezuela - Angela Ruiz |
| 1st Runner Up | Colombia - Jenny Marcela Arias |
| 2nd Runner Up | Spain - Ana Isabel Miranda |
| 3rd Runner Up | Bolivia - María Teresa Roca |

=== Special awards ===
- Queen of Water: Costa Rica
- Finalists: Chile, Spain
- Queen of Police: United States
- Finalists: Bolivia, Venezuela
- Best Face: Costa Rica
- Best Hair: Costa Rica

== Official delegates ==
| Country | Contestant | Age | Height (cm) | Height (ft) | Hometown |
|---|---|---|---|---|---|
| Argentina | Daiana Laura Incandela | 21 | 180 | 5'11" | Buenos Aires |
| Bahamas | Tempest Stubbs | 24 | 172 | 5'7.5" | Freeport |
| Bolivia | María Teresa Roca Córdova | 26 | 177 | 5'9" | Trinidad |
| Brazil | Isabelle Cristina Nunes Sampaio | 23 | 174 | 5'8.5" | Recife |
| Canada | Jamie Caitlin Molz | 21 | 180 | 5'11" | Burnaby |
| Chile | Romina Sabina Godoy Retamales | 25 | 173 | 5'8" | Santiago |
| Colombia | Jenny Marcela Arias Villada | 23 | 168 | 5'6" | Villavicencio |
| Costa Rica | María Amalia Matamoros Solís | 21 | 176 | 5'9.5" | Alajuela |
| Dominican Republic | Sofinel Báez Santos | 20 | 182 | 5'11.5" | Nagua |
| Ecuador | María Verónica Ochoa Crespo | 24 | 175 | 5'9" | Cuenca |
| El Salvador | Ana Mariella Roca Trigueros | 18 | 165 | 5'5" | San Salvador |
| England | Jessica Rose Edwards Monroy | 23 | 172 | 5'7.5" | London |
| Guatemala | Dina Gabriela Asturias Molina | 25 | 165 | 5'5" | Guatemala City |
| Honduras | Marilyn Elizabeth Medina | 19 | 170 | 5'7" | Los Angeles |
| Mexico | Daniela Valenzuela Priego | 18 | 168 | 5'6" | Cárdenas |
| Panama | Karen Jordán | 21 | 175 | 5'9" | Chiriquí |
| Paraguay | María Belén Alonso Virgili | 21 | 171 | 5'7.5" | Asunción |
| Poland | Agnieszka Ptak | 22 | 178 | 5'10" | Poniatowa |
| Puerto Rico | Bianca Michelle Cintrón | 22 | 178 | 5'10" | San Juan |
| Spain | Ana Isabel Miranda Socorro | 19 | 181 | 5'11" | Telde |
| United States | Jocell Villa | 19 | 178 | 5'10" | Hacienda Heights |
| Venezuela | Angela Julieta Ruiz Pérez | 21 | 180 | 5'11" | Maturín |
