= Marelisa Gibson =

Venezuelan designer (born 1988)

- Born: Marelisa Gibson Villegas; 26 August 1988 (age 38); Caracas, Venezuela
- Height: 1.78 m (5 ft 10 in)
- Beauty pageant titleholder
- Title: Miss Miranda 2009; Miss Venezuela 2009
- Hair color: Brown
- Eye color: Brown
- Major competitions: Miss Venezuela 2009 (Winner); Miss Universe 2010 (Unplaced)

Marelisa Gibson Villegas (born 26 August 1988) is a Venezuelan designer and beauty pageant titleholder who won Miss Venezuela 2009 and represented her country at Miss Universe 2010 in Las Vegas.

== Early life ==
Gibson was born in Caracas, where she used to study architecture at the Central University of Venezuela. She speaks Spanish, English and French. Gibson attended the Art Institute of Philadelphia for Interior Design.

== Career ==
=== Miss Venezuela ===
Gibson won the Best Face award. Miss Venezuela, Marelisa Gibson, did not place in the top 15 at Miss Universe 2010.

Awards and achievements
Preceded by Stefanía Fernández	Miss Venezuela; 2009	Succeeded by Vanessa Gonçalves
Preceded by Viviana Ramos	Miss Miranda; 2009	Succeeded by Vanessa Gonçalves
