= Satanic panic =

Widespread moral panic alleging abuse

The Satanic panic is a moral panic consisting of over 12,000 unsubstantiated cases of Satanic ritual abuse (SRA), sometimes known as ritual abuse, starting in North America in the 1980s, spreading throughout many parts of the world by the late 1990s, and persisting today. The panic originated in 1980 with the publication of Michelle Remembers, a book co-written by Canadian psychiatrist Lawrence Pazder and his patient (and future wife), Michelle Smith, which used the now discredited practice of recovered-memory therapy to make claims about Satanic ritual abuse involving Smith. The allegations, which arose afterward throughout much of the United States, involved reports of physical and sexual abuse of people in the context of occult or Satanic rituals. Some allegations involve a conspiracy of a global Satanic cult that includes the wealthy and elite in which children are abducted or bred for human sacrifice, pornography, and prostitution.

Nearly every aspect of the ritual abuse is controversial, including its definition, the source of the allegations and proof thereof, testimonies of alleged victims, and court cases and criminal investigations involving the allegations. The panic affected lawyers, therapists, and social workers who handled allegations of child sexual abuse. Allegations initially brought together widely dissimilar groups, including religious fundamentalists, police investigators, child advocates, therapists, and clients in psychotherapy. The term satanic abuse was more common early on; this later became satanic ritual abuse and further secularized into simply ritual abuse. Over time, the accusations became more closely associated with dissociative identity disorder (then called multiple personality disorder) and anti-government conspiracy theories, such as QAnon.

Initial interest arose via the publicity campaign for Michelle Remembers, and it was sustained and popularized throughout the decade by coverage of the McMartin preschool trial. Testimonials, symptom lists, rumors, and techniques to investigate or uncover memories of SRA were disseminated through professional, popular, and religious conferences as well as through talk shows, sustaining and further spreading the moral panic throughout the United States and beyond. In some cases, allegations resulted in criminal trials with varying results; after seven years in court, the McMartin trial resulted in no convictions for any of the accused, while other cases resulted in lengthy sentences, some of which were later reversed. Scholarly research eventually resulted in the conclusion that the phenomenon was a moral panic, which, as one researcher put it in 2017, "involved hundreds of accusations that devil-worshipping paedophiles were operating America's white middle-class suburban daycare centers".

A 1994 article in the New York Times stated that: "Of the more than 12,000 documented accusations nationwide, investigating police were not able to substantiate any allegations of organized cult abuse".

== History ==
=== Origins ===
Among the explanations of why the panic occurred when it did, or "took the shape that it did", include

- Three films that opened and ran near the beginning of the panic pertained to Satanism, namely Rosemary’s Baby (1968), The Exorcist (1973), and The Omen (1976). According to scholar Joseph Laycock, patients hypnotized by therapists to recover memories of SRA, often "seemed to be recalling scenes from these films".
- The reaction against the surge of new religious movements (NRMs) in the 1960s due to both the immigration reform allowing missionaries for Asian religions, as well as new religions, (including the Church of Satan), arising from the counterculture of the baby boomer generation. Sometimes called the "cult wars" or "cult scare".
- The Tate–LaBianca murders committed by cult members in the Manson Family which consisted of "mostly lonely teenagers from broken homes".
- Mike Warnke's bestselling 1972 memoir The Satan Seller, in which he claimed to have led a group of 1,500 Satanists that engaged in rape and human sacrifice before he converted to evangelical Christianity. The book was praised by Moody Monthly and The Christian Century. Two decades later the book was debunked by an evangelical magazine, Cornerstone.

=== Early history ===
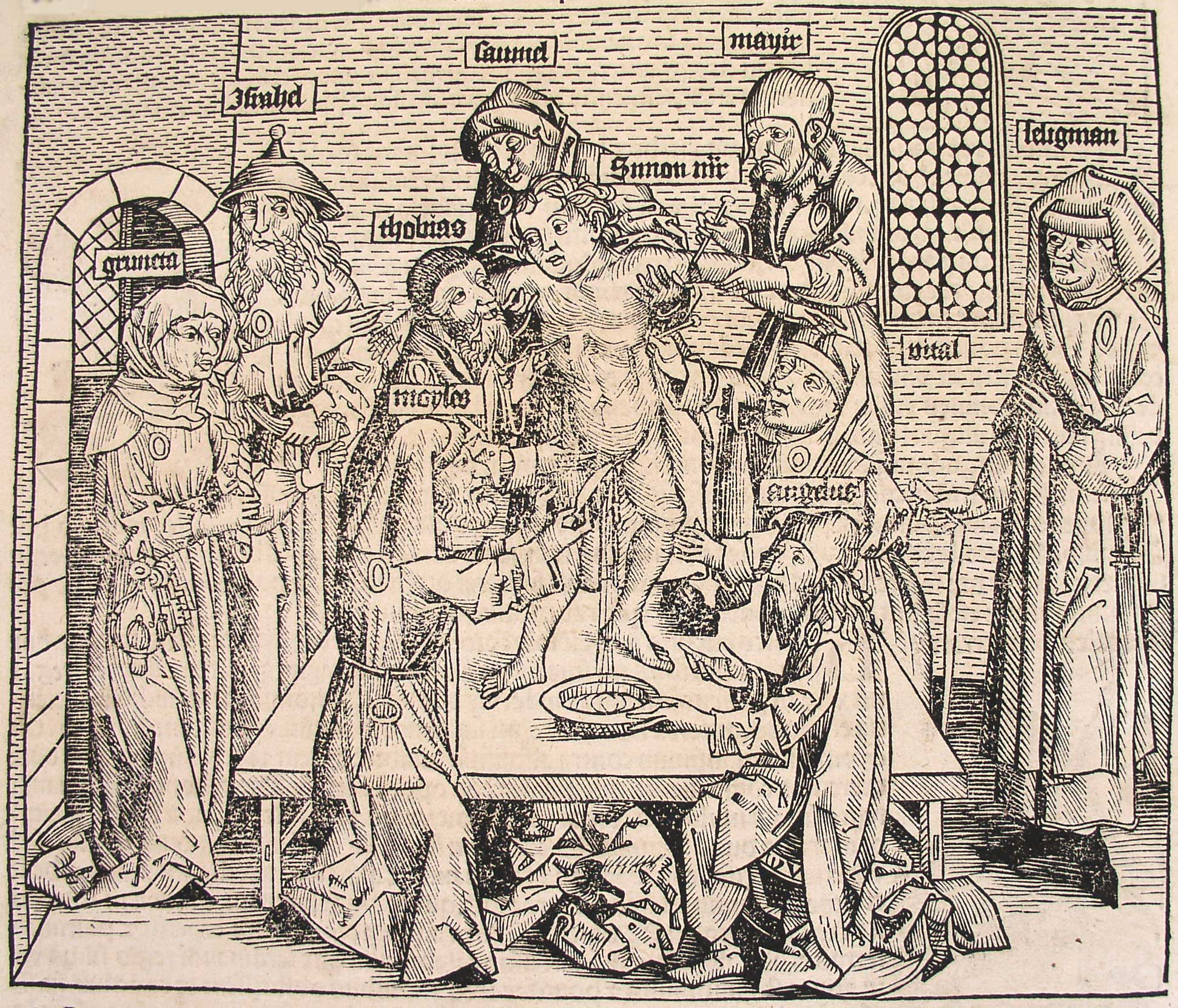
Blood libel accusations against Jews are considered historical precursors of the modern moral panic.

Allegations of horrific acts by outside groups, including cannibalism, child murder, torture, and incestuous orgies can place minorities in the role of the "Other", as well create a scapegoat for complex problems in times of social disruption. The SRA panic repeated many of the features of historical moral panics and conspiracy theories, such as the blood libel against Jews by Apion in the 30s CE, the wild rumors that led to the persecutions of early Christians in the Roman Empire, later allegations of Jewish rituals involving the cannibalism of Christian babies and desecration of the Eucharist, and the witch hunts of the 16th and 17th centuries. Torture and imprisonment were used by authority figures in order to coerce confessions from alleged Satanists, confessions that were later used to justify their executions. Records of these older allegations were linked by contemporary proponents in an effort to demonstrate that contemporary Satanic cults were part of an ancient conspiracy of evil, though ultimately no evidence of devil-worshiping cults existed in Europe at any time in its history.

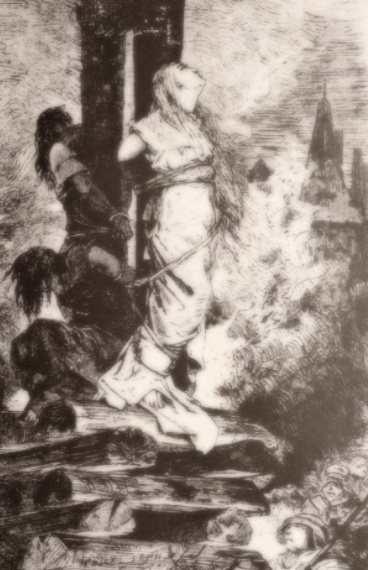
In Early Modern Europe people accused of being witches were stated to be working for Satan and burned at the stake.

A more immediate precedent to the context of Satanic ritual abuse in the United States was McCarthyism in the 1950s. The underpinnings for the contemporary moral panic were found in a rise of five factors in the years leading up to the 1980s: the establishment of fundamentalist Christianity and the founding and political activism of the religious organization which was named the Moral Majority; the rise of the anti-cult movement which accused abusive cults of kidnapping and brainwashing children and teens; the appearance of the Church of Satan and other explicitly Satanist groups which added a kernel of truth to the existence of Satanic cults; the development of the social work or child protection field, and its struggle to have child sexual abuse recognized as a social problem and a serious crime; and the popularization of post-traumatic stress disorder, repressed memory, and the corresponding survivor movement.

=== Michelle Remembers ===
Michelle Remembers, written by Canadians Michelle Smith and her husband, psychiatrist Lawrence Pazder, was published in 1980. Now discredited, the book was written in the form of an autobiography, presenting the first modern claim that child abuse was linked to Satanic rituals. According to the "memoir", at the age of five Michelle was tortured by her mother for days in "elaborate satanic rituals". As the torture reached a climax, a portal to hell opened and Satan himself appeared, only to be driven away by the Virgin Mary and Archangel Michael. Explanations for a lack of any evidence of abuse on Michelle's body were that it had been miraculously removed by St. Mary. Not explained was testimony from Michelle's father and two sisters, contradicting the memoir, as well as a 1955/56 St. Margaret's School yearbook. The yearbook includes a photo taken in November 1955 showing Michelle attending school and appearing healthy, when according to Pazder's book Michelle spent that month imprisoned in a basement.

Pazder was also responsible for coining the term ritual abuse. Michelle Remembers provided a model for numerous allegations of SRA that ensued later in the same decade. On the basis of the book's success, Pazder developed a high media profile, gave lectures and training on SRA to law enforcement, and by September 1990 had acted as a consultant on more than 1,000 SRA cases, including the McMartin preschool trial. Prosecutors used Michelle Remembers as a guide when preparing cases against alleged Satanists. Michelle Remembers, along with other accounts portrayed as survivor stories, are suspected to have influenced later allegations of SRA, and the book has been suggested as a causal factor in the later epidemic of SRA allegations.

The early 1980s, during the implementation of mandatory reporting laws, saw a large increase in child protection investigations in America, Britain, and other developed countries, along with a heightened public awareness of child abuse. The investigation of incest allegations in California was also changed, with cases led by social workers who used leading and coercive interviewing techniques that had been avoided by police investigators. Such changes in the prosecution of cases of alleged incest resulted in an increase in confessions by fathers in exchange for plea bargains. Shortly thereafter, some children in child protection cases began making allegations of horrific physical and sexual abuse by caregivers within organized rituals, claiming sexual abuse in Satanic rituals and the use of Satanic symbols. These cases garnered the label satanic ritual abuse both in the media and among professionals. Childhood memories of similar abuse began to appear in the psychotherapy sessions of adults.

=== McMartin preschool trial ===
In 1983, charges were laid in the McMartin preschool trial, a major case in California, which received attention throughout the United States and contained allegations of satanic ritual abuse. The case caused tremendous polarization in how to interpret the available evidence. Shortly afterward, more than 100 preschools across the country became the object of similar sensationalist allegations, which were eagerly and uncritically reported by the press. Throughout the McMartin trial, media coverage of the defendants (Peggy McMartin and Ray Buckey) was unrelentingly negative, focusing only on statements by the prosecution. Michelle Smith and other alleged survivors met with parents involved in the trial, and it is believed that they influenced testimony against the accused.

Kee MacFarlane, a social worker employed by the Children's Institute International, developed a new way to interrogate children with anatomically correct dolls and used them in an effort to assist disclosures of abuse with the McMartin children. After asking the children to point to the places on the dolls where they had allegedly been touched and asking leading questions, MacFarlane diagnosed sexual abuse in virtually all the McMartin children. She coerced disclosures by using lengthy interviews that rewarded discussions of abuse and punished denials. The trial testimony that resulted from such methods was often contradictory and vague on all details except for the assertion that the abuse had occurred. Although the initial charges in the McMartin case featured allegations of Satanic abuse and a vast conspiracy, these features were dropped relatively early in the trial, and prosecution continued only for non-ritual allegations of child abuse against only two defendants. After three years of testimony, McMartin and Buckey were acquitted on 52 of 65 counts, and the jury was deadlocked on the remaining 13 charges against Buckey, with 11 of 13 jurors choosing not guilty. Buckey was re-charged and two years later released without conviction.

=== Conspiracy theories ===
In 1984, MacFarlane warned a congressional committee that children were being forced to engage in scatological behavior and watch bizarre rituals in which animals were being slaughtered. Shortly after, the United States Congress doubled its budget for child-protection programs. Psychiatrist Roland C. Summit delivered conferences in the wake of the McMartin trial and depicted the phenomenon as a conspiracy that involved anyone skeptical of the phenomenon. By 1986, social worker Carol Darling argued to a grand jury that the conspiracy reached the government. Her husband Brad Darling gave conference presentations about a Satanic conspiracy of great antiquity which he now believed was permeating American communities.

In 1985, Patricia Pulling joined forces with psychiatrist Thomas Radecki, director of the National Coalition on Television Violence, to create B.A.D.D. (Bothered About Dungeons and Dragons). Pulling and B.A.D.D. saw role-playing games generally and Dungeons & Dragons specifically as Satanic cult recruitment tools, inducing youth to suicide, murder, and Satanic ritual abuse. Other alleged recruitment tools included heavy metal music, educators, child care centers, and television. This information was shared at policing and public awareness seminars on crime and the occult, sometimes by active police officers. None of these allegations held up in analysis or in court. In fact, analysis of youth suicide over the period in question found that players of role-playing games actually had a much lower rate of suicide than the average.

Among the conspiracy theories alleged by the panic were that thousands of people a year were being killed by a network of Satanists, what one psychiatrist writing in a psychiatric journal called “a hidden holocaust”.

Explanations for how Satanists covered up this slaughter included their infiltrating media and law enforcement, as well as morticians and crematorium operators to make sure no bodies were ever found. Other versions claimed that there were no missing persons because Satanists used certain women as breeders, providing Satanists with thousands of babies for human sacrifices.

By the late 1980s, therapists or patients who believed someone had suffered from SRA could suggest solutions that included Christian psychotherapy, exorcism, and support groups whose members self-identified as "anti-Satanic warriors". Federal funding was increased for research on child abuse, with large portions of the funding allocated for research on child sexual abuse. Funding was also provided for conferences supporting the idea of SRA, adding a veneer of respectability to the idea as well as offering an opportunity for prosecutors to exchange advice on how to best secure convictions—with tactics including destruction of notes, refusing to tape interviews with children, and destroying or refusing to share evidence with the defense. Had proof been found, SRA would have represented the first occasion where an organized and secret criminal activity had been discovered by mental health professionals. In 1987, Geraldo Rivera produced a national television special on the alleged secret cults, claiming "Estimates are that there are over one million Satanists in [the United States and they are] linked in a highly organized, secretive network." Tapings of this and similar talk show episodes were subsequently used by religious fundamentalists, psychotherapists, social workers and police to promote the idea that a conspiracy of Satanic cults existed and these cults were committing serious crimes.

In the 1990s, psychologist D. Corydon Hammond publicized a detailed theory of ritual abuse drawn from hypnotherapy sessions with his patients, alleging they were victims of a worldwide conspiracy of organized, secretive clandestine cells who used torture, mind control and ritual abuse to create alternate personalities that could be "activated" with code words; the victims were allegedly trained as assassins, prostitutes, drug traffickers, and child sex workers (to create child pornography). Hammond claimed his patients had revealed the conspiracy was masterminded by a Jewish doctor in Nazi Germany, but who now worked for the Central Intelligence Agency with a goal of worldwide domination by a Satanic cult. The cult was allegedly composed of respectable, powerful members of society who used the funds generated to further their agenda. Missing memories among the victims and absence of evidence was cited as evidence of the power and effectiveness of this cult in furthering its agenda. Hammond's claims gained considerable attention, due in part to his prominence in the field of hypnosis and psychotherapy.

=== Religious roots and secularization ===
Satanic ritual abuse brought together several groups normally unlikely to associate, including psychotherapists, self-help groups, religious fundamentalists and law enforcement. Initial accusations were made in the context of the rising political power of the conservative Christian right within the United States, and religious fundamentalists enthusiastically promoted rumors of SRA. Psychotherapists who were actively Christian advocated for the diagnosis of dissociative identity disorder (DID); soon after, accounts similar to Michelle Remembers began to appear, with some therapists believing the alter egos of some patients were the result of demonic possession. Evangelical Protestantism was instrumental in starting, spreading, and maintaining rumors through sermons about the dangers of SRA, lectures by purported experts, and prayer sessions, including showings of the 1987 Geraldo Rivera television special. Secular proponents appeared, and child protection workers became significantly involved. Law enforcement trainers, many themselves strongly religious, became strong promoters of the claims and self-described experts on the topic. Their involvement in child sexual abuse cases produced more allegations of SRA, adding credibility to the phenomenon. As the explanations for SRA were distanced from evangelical Christianity and associated with "survivor" groups, the motivations ascribed to purported Satanists shifted from combating a religious nemesis, to mind control and abuse as an end to itself. Clinicians, psychotherapists and social workers documented clients with alleged histories of SRA, though the claims of therapists were unsubstantiated beyond the testimonies of their clients.

=== International spread ===
In 1987, a list of "indicators" was published by Catherine Gould, featuring a broad array of vague symptoms that were ultimately common, non-specific and subjective, purported to be capable of diagnosing SRA in most young children. By the late 1980s, allegations began to appear throughout the world (including Canada, Australia, the United Kingdom, New Zealand, the Netherlands, and Scandinavia), in part enabled by English as a common international language and in the United Kingdom, assisted by Gould's list of indicators.

Belief in SRA spread rapidly through the ranks of mental health professionals (despite an absence of evidence) through a variety of continuing education seminars, during which attendees were urged to believe in the reality of Satanic cults, their victims, and not to question the extreme and bizarre memories uncovered. Support for these claims was offered in the form of unconnected bits of information such as pictures drawn by patients, heavy metal album covers, historical folklore about devil worshippers, and pictures of mutilated animals. During the seminars, patients provided testimonials of their experiences and presenters stressed that recovering memories was important for healing:

- In 1986, the largest symposium on child abuse in history was held in Australia, with addresses by vocal SRA advocates Kee MacFarlane, Roland Summit, Astrid Heppenstall Heger, and David Finkelhor.
- In 1987, writings on the phenomenon appeared in the United Kingdom along with incidents featuring broadly similar accusations such as the Cleveland child abuse scandal; allegations of SRA in Nottingham resulted in the "British McMartin", advised in part by the British journalist Tim Tate's work on the subject. Along with the list of indicators, American conference speakers, pamphlets, source materials, consultants, vocabulary regarding SRA and allegedly funding were imported, which promoted the identification and counseling of British SRA allegations. The Nottingham investigation resulted in criminal charges of severe child abuse that ultimately had nothing to do with Satanic rituals, and was criticized for focusing on the irrelevant and non-existent Satanic aspects of the allegations at the expense of the severe conventional abuse endured by the children.
- In 1989, San Francisco Police detective Sandi Gallant gave an interview with a newspaper in the United Kingdom. At the same time, several other therapists toured the country giving talks on SRA, and shortly thereafter SRA cases were reported in Orkney, Rochdale, London, and Nottingham.
- In 1992, charges were laid in the Martensville satanic sex scandal; charges were overturned in 1995 on the grounds of improper interviewing of the children.
- A wave of SRA accusations appeared in New Zealand in 1991, and in Norway in 1992.
- In the mid-nineties in Egypt, tabloids such as Rose Al Youssef started publishing articles about an alleged subculture of Satan worshipping and rituals spreading among the teens and youth of the middle and upper-middle class and associating it with heavy metal music, bands, symbolism, and graffiti. The original article published on 11 November 1996 was written by Abdallah Kamal, but soon other writers and journalists, including Adel Hammuda and others. The public intrigue eventually led to the security apparatus raiding the homes of some young people in the music scene and their friends, confiscating posts and tapes and CDs, forcing short hairstyles on them and subjecting them to religious reformation sessions, before releasing them, but the scare continued to be stirred from time to time until the mid-2000s, and became books and talk shows.
- In 1998, Jean LaFontaine produced a book indicating allegations of SRA in the United Kingdom were sparked by investigations supervised by social workers who had taken SRA seminars in the United States.
- In 2021 and 2022, two consecutive reports by Swiss Television journalists Ilona Stämpfli and Robin Rehmann presented evidence that conspiracy theories closely related to the Satanic panic were still held by various groups and individuals in Switzerland, among them teachers, psychotherapists, high-ranking police officers, and a senior physician of Clienia, the largest private psychiatric clinic group in Switzerland. As a reaction to the first documentary, two of the interviewed teachers as well as the senior physician were let go by their employers.

=== Skepticism, rejection, and contemporary persistence ===
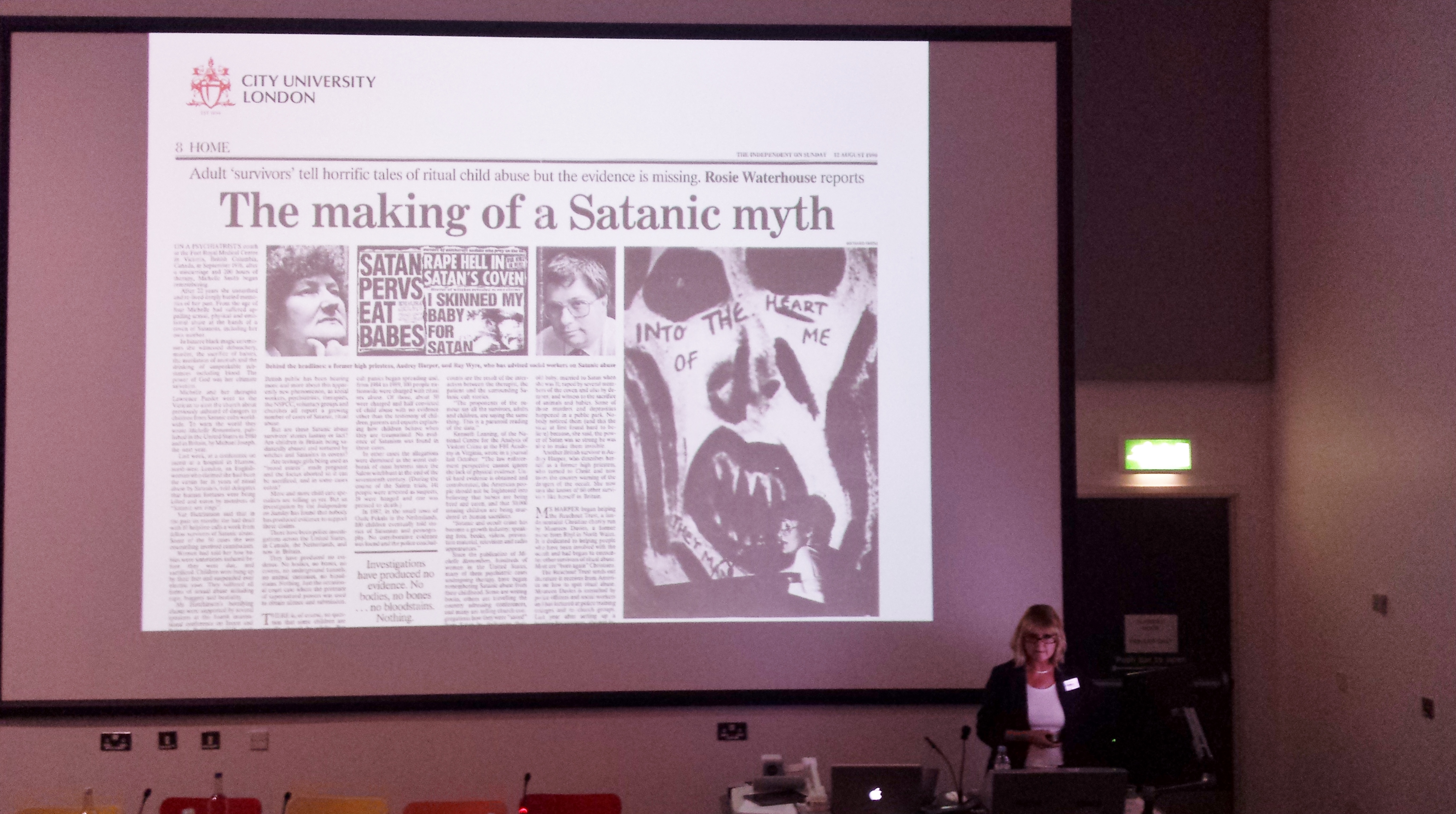
Rosie Waterhouse lecturing about Satanic Panics during the European Skeptics Congress 2015

Media coverage of SRA began to turn negative by 1987, and the "panic" ended between 1992 and 1995. The release of the HBO made-for-TV movie Indictment: The McMartin Trial in 1995 re-cast Ray Buckey as a victim of overzealous prosecution rather than an abusive predator, and marked a watershed change in public perceptions of satanic ritual abuse accusations. In 1995, Geraldo Rivera issued an apology for his 1987 television special which had focused on the alleged cults. In 1996 astrophysicist and astrobiologist Carl Sagan devoted an entire chapter of his final book, The Demon-Haunted World: Science as a Candle in the Dark to a critique of claims of recovered memories of alien abductions and satanic ritual abuse, citing material from the newsletter of the False Memory Syndrome Foundation. By 2003, allegations of ritual abuse were met with great skepticism, and belief in SRA was no longer considered mainstream in professional circles; although the sexual abuse of children was and is a real and serious problem, allegations of SRA were essentially false. Reasons for the collapse of the phenomenon include the failure of criminal prosecutions against alleged abusers, a growing number of scholars, officials and reporters questioning the reality of the accusations, and a variety of successful lawsuits against mental health professionals.

Some feminist critics of the SRA diagnoses maintained that, in the course of attempting to purge society of evil, the panic of the 1980s and 1990s obscured actual child-abuse issues, a concern echoed by author Gary Clapton. In England, the SRA panic diverted resources and attention away from proven abuse cases; this resulted in a "hierarchy" of abuse in which SRA was the most serious form, physical and sexual abuse being minimized and/or marginalized, and "mere" physical abuse no longer worthy of intervention. As criticism of SRA investigations increased, the focus by social workers on SRA resulted in a large loss of credibility to the profession. SRA, with its sensational narrative of many victims abused by many victimizers, ended up robbing the far-more-common and proven issue of incest against children of much of its societal significance. The National Center on Child Abuse and Neglect devised the term religious abuse to describe exorcism, poisoning, and drowning of children in non-satanic religious settings in order to avoid confusion with SRA.

Some groups still believe there is credence to allegations of SRA and continue to discuss the topic. Publications by Cathy O'Brien claiming SRA was the result of government programs (specifically the Central Intelligence Agency's Project MKULTRA) to produce Manchurian candidate-style mind control in young children were picked up by conspiracy theorists, linking belief in SRA with claims of government conspiracies. In the 2007 book Mistakes Were Made (but Not by Me), authors Carol Tavris and Elliot Aronson cite an ongoing belief in the SRA phenomenon, despite a complete lack of evidence, as demonstration of confirmation bias in believers; it further points out that a lack of evidence is actually considered by believers in SRA as additional evidence, demonstrating "how clever and evil the cult leaders were: They were eating those babies, bones and all." A Salt Lake City therapist, Barbara Snow, was put on probation in 2008 for planting false memories of satanic abuse in patients. One notable client of hers was Teal Swan. The International Society for the Study of Trauma and Dissociation (ISSTD), a professional nonprofit organization, is known for its advocacy of contemporary narratives surrounding alleged satanic conspiracies. Historically, the organization has convened annual conference presentations dedicated to the exploration and discussion of these topics. In a 2014 book published by Oxford University Press, political science professor Ross E. Cheit argued that "the witch hunt narrative" is misleading and real abuse occurred in some of the high-profile cases of the 1980s, while acknowledging that false accusations also took place.

The far-right conspiracy theory movement known as QAnon, which originated on 4chan in 2017, has adopted many of the tropes of SRA and Satanic Panic. Instead of daycare centers being the center of abuse, however, liberal Hollywood actors, Democratic politicians, and high-ranking government officials are portrayed as a child-abusing cabal of Satanists.

== Definitions ==
The term satanic ritual abuse is used to describe different behaviors, actions and allegations that lie between extremes of definitions. In 1988, a nationwide study of sexual abuse in US day care agencies, led by David Finkelhor, divided "ritual abuse" allegations into three categories—cult-based ritualism in which the abuse had a spiritual or social goal for the perpetrators, pseudo-ritualism in which the goal was sexual gratification and the rituals were used to frighten or intimidate victims, and psychopathological ritualism in which the rituals were due to mental disorders. Subsequent investigators have expanded on these definitions and also pointed to a fourth alleged type of Satanic ritual abuse, in which petty crimes with ambiguous meaning (such as graffiti or vandalism) generally committed by teenagers were attributed to the actions of Satanic cults.

By the early 1990s, the phrase "Satanic ritual abuse" was featured in media coverage of ritualistic abuse but its use decreased among professionals in favor of more nuanced terms such as multi-dimensional child sex rings, ritual/ritualistic abuse, organized abuse or sadistic abuse, some of which acknowledged the complexity of abuse cases with multiple perpetrators and victims without projecting a religious framework onto perpetrators. The latter in particular failed to substantively improve on or replace "Satanic" abuse as it was never used to describe any rituals except the Satanic ones that were the core of SRA allegations. Abuse within the context of Christianity, Islam, or any other religions failed to enter the SRA discourse.

=== Cult-based abuse ===
Allegation of cult-based abuse is the most extreme scenario of SRA. During the initial period of interest starting in the early 1980s the term was used to describe a network of Satan-worshipping, secretive intergenerational cults that were supposedly part of a highly organized conspiracy engaged in criminal behaviors such as forced prostitution, drug distribution and pornography. These cults were also thought to sexually abuse and torture children in order to coerce them into a lifetime of Devil worship. Other allegations included bizarre sexual acts such as necrophilia, forced ingestion of semen, blood and feces, cannibalism, orgies, liturgical parody such as pseudosacramental use of feces and urine; infanticide, sacrificial abortions to eat fetuses and human sacrifice; satanic police officers who covered up evidence of SRA crimes and desecration of Christian graves. No evidence of any of these claims has ever been found; the proof presented by those who alleged the reality of cult-based abuse primarily consisted of the memories of adults recalling childhood abuse, the testimony of young children and extremely controversial confessions. The idea of a murderous Satanic conspiracy created a controversy dividing the professional child abuse community at the time, though no evidence has been found to support allegations of a large number of children being killed or abused in Satanic rituals. From a law enforcement perspective, an intergenerational conspiracy dedicated to ritual sacrifice whose members remain completely silent, make no mistakes and leave no physical evidence is unlikely; cases of what the media incorrectly perceived as actual cult sacrifices (such as the 1989 case of Adolfo Constanzo) have supported this idea.

=== Criminal and delusional satanism ===
A third variation of ritual abuse involves non-religious ritual abuse in which the rituals were delusional or obsessive. There are incidents of extreme sadistic crimes that are committed by individuals, loosely organized families and possibly in some organized cults, some of which may be connected to Satanism, though this is more likely to be related to sex trafficking; though SRA may happen in families, extended families and localized groups, it is not believed to occur in large, organized groups.

=== Acting out ===
Investigators considered graffiti such as the pentagram to be evidence of a Satanic cult. Ambiguous crimes in which actual or erroneously believed symbols of Satanism appear have also been claimed as part of the SRA phenomenon, though in most cases the crimes cannot be linked to a specific belief system; minor crimes such as vandalism, trespassing and graffiti were often found to be the actions of teenagers who were acting out.

=== Polarization ===
There was never any consensus on what actually constituted Satanic ritual abuse. This lack of a single definition, as well as confusion between the meanings of the term ritual (religious versus psychological) allowed a wide range of allegations and evidence to be claimed as a demonstration of the reality of SRA allegations, irrespective of which "definition" the evidence supported. Acrimonious disagreements between groups who supported SRA allegations as authentic and those criticizing them as unsubstantiated resulted in an extremely polarized discussion with little middle ground. The lack of credible evidence for the more extreme interpretations often being seen as evidence of an effective conspiracy rather than an indication that the allegations are unfounded. The religious beliefs or atheism of the disputants have also resulted in different interpretations of evidence, and as well as accusations of those who reject the claims being "anti-child". Both believers and skeptics have developed networks to disseminate information on their respective positions. One of the central themes of the discussion among English child abuse professionals was the assertion that people should simply "believe the children", and that the testimony of children was sufficient proof, which ignored the fact that in many cases the testimony of children was interpreted by professionals rather than the children explicitly disclosing allegations of abuse. In some cases this was simultaneously presented with the idea that it did not matter if SRA actually existed, that the empirical truth of SRA was irrelevant, that the testimony of children was more important than that of doctors, social workers and the criminal justice system.

== Evidence ==
The National Center on Child Abuse and Neglect conducted a study led by University of California psychologist Gail Goodman, which found that among 12,000 accusations of ritual or religious-linked abuse, there was no evidence for "a well-organized intergenerational satanic cult, who sexually molested and tortured children", although there was "convincing evidence of lone perpetrators or couples who say they are involved with Satan or use the claim to intimidate victims". One such case Goodman studied involved "grandparents [who] had black robes, candles, and Christ on an inverted crucifix—and the children had chlamydia, a sexually transmitted disease, in their throats", according to the report by a district attorney.

The evidence for SRA was primarily in the form of testimonies from children who made allegations of SRA, and adults who claim to remember abuse during childhood, that may have been forgotten and recovered during therapy.

With both children and adults, no corroborating evidence has been found for anything except pseudosatanism in which the satanic and ritual aspects were secondary to and used as a cover for sexual abuse. Despite this lack of objective evidence, and aided by the competing definitions of what SRA actually was, proponents claimed SRA was a real phenomenon throughout the peak and during the decline of the moral panic. Despite allegations appearing in the United States, Netherlands, Sweden, New Zealand and Australia, no material evidence has been found to corroborate allegations of organized cult-based abuse that practices human sacrifice and cannibalism. Though trauma specialists frequently claimed the allegations made by children and adults were the same, in reality the statements made by adults were more elaborate, severe, and featured more bizarre abuse. In 95 percent of the adults' cases, the memories of the abuse were recovered during psychotherapy.

For several years, a conviction list assembled by the Believe the Children advocacy group was circulated as proof of the truth of satanic ritual abuse allegations, though the organization itself no longer exists and the list itself is "egregiously out of date".

=== Investigations ===
Two investigations were carried out to assess the evidence for SRA. In the United Kingdom, a government report produced no evidence of SRA, but several examples of false satanists faking rituals to frighten their victims. In the United States, evidence was reported but was based on a flawed method with an overly liberal definition of a substantiated case.

==== United Kingdom ====
A British study published in 1996 found 62 cases of alleged ritual abuse reported to researchers by police, social and welfare agencies from the period of 1988 to 1991, representing a tiny proportion of extremely high-profile cases compared to the total number investigated by the agencies. Anthropologist Jean La Fontaine spent several years researching ritual abuse cases in Britain at the behest of the government, finding that all of the cases of alleged satanic ritual abuse that could be substantiated were cases where the perpetrators' goal was sexual gratification rather than religious worship. Producing several reports and the 1998 book Speak of the Devil, after reviewing cases reported to police and children's protective services throughout the country, LaFontaine concluded that the only rituals she uncovered were those invented by child abusers to frighten their victims or justify the sexual abuse. In addition, the sexual abuse occurred outside of the rituals, indicating the goal of the abuser was sexual gratification rather than ritualistic or religious. In cases involving satanic abuse, the satanic allegations by younger children were influenced by adults, and the concerns over the satanic aspects were found to be compelling due to cultural attraction of the concept but distracting from the actual harm caused to the abuse victims.

In more recent years, discredited allegations of SRA have been levelled against Jimmy Savile during the posthumous investigation into his sexual abuse of children, as well as against former Prime Minister Ted Heath (who was previously falsely accused of SRA during his lifetime).

==== United States ====
David Finkelhor completed an investigation of child sexual abuse in daycares in the United States and published a report in 1988. The report found 270 cases of sexual abuse, of which 36 were classified as substantiated cases of ritual abuse. Mary de Young has pointed out that the report's definition of "substantiated" was overly liberal as it required only that one agency had decided that abuse had occurred, even if no action was taken, no arrests made, no operating licenses suspended. In addition, multiple agencies may have been involved in each case (including the Federal Bureau of Investigation, local police, social services agencies and childhood protective services in many cases), with wide differences in suspicion and confirmation, often in disagreement with each other. Finkelhor, upon receiving a "confirmation", would collect information from whoever was willing or interested to provide it and did not independently investigate the cases, resulting in frequent errors in his conclusions. No data is provided beyond case studies and brief summaries. Three other cases considered corroborating by the public—the McMartin preschool trial, the Country Walk case and the murders in Matamoros, by Adolfo Constanzo—ultimately failed to support the existence of SRA. The primary witness in the Country Walk case repeatedly made, then withdrew accusations against her husband amid unusual and coercive inquiries by her lawyer and a psychologist. The Matamoros murders produced the bodies of 12 adults who were ritually sacrificed by a drug gang inspired by the film The Believers, but did not involve children or sexual abuse. The McMartin case resulted in no convictions and was ultimately based on accusations by children with no proof beyond their coerced testimonies. A 1990/1991 survey of clinicians, which reviewed 386 allegations of ritual and 191 allegations of religious abuse, described 10% and under 3% of those allegations, respectively, as unfounded following social service investigation.

==== The Netherlands ====
Dutch investigative journalists from Argos (NPO Radio 1) collected the experiences and stories of over two hundred victims of organized sexual abuse. A hundred and forty victims told Argos about ritual abuse. Six well-known people were mentioned as perpetrators by multiple participants in the investigation, and over ten abuse locations. A warehouse in the Bollenstreek was marked as a location for 'storage' and the production of child pornography. During the investigation the Argos journalists received an anonymous email stating the journalists had to 'beaware' because "they know about your investigation", remarking "they're going to get rid of evidence – just like they did with Dutroux". The same day as the journalists received the e-mail, the warehouse in the Bollenstreek burnt down. According to Argos, the damage had been classified so severe by the fire department, that a cause of fire could not be determined.

As a response to parliamentary questions following the Argos investigation, Dutch Minister of Justice and Security Ferdinand Grapperhaus said on August 27, 2020, that there would be 'no independent investigation into Ritual Abuse' of children in The Netherlands. The Green Left, the Socialist Party and the Labour Party criticized Grapperhaus for his decision. On October 13, 2020, the Dutch House of Representatives approved a motion in which the PvdA, GL and the SP requested that an independent investigation be conducted into the nature and extent of "organized sadistic abuse of children", bypassing Grapperhaus' original refusal to investigate.

In a Skeptical Inquirer article JD Sword discusses the outcomes of a subsequent commission appointed by Grapperhaus and led by Jan Hendriks, professor of criminology from the Vrije Universiteit in Amsterdam and associate professor Anne-Marie Slotboom. In December 2022 Hendriks returned a report which found there is no evidence of organized abuse with ritualistic features and “Overall, victims are the only primary source reporting this type of abuse and no support for its existence is found from other sources.”

=== Patients' allegations ===
The majority of adult testimonials were given by adults while they were undergoing psychotherapy, in most cases they were undergoing therapy which was designed to elicit memories of SRA. Therapists claimed that the pain which their patients felt, the internal consistency of their stories and the similarities of the allegations which were made by different patients all proved the existence of SRA, but despite this, the disclosures of patients never resulted in any corroboration; The allegations which were obtained from the alleged victims by mental health practitioners all lacked verifiable evidence, they were entirely anecdotal and they all involved incidents which occurred years or decades earlier. The concern for therapists revolved around the pain of their clients, which is for them more important than the truth of their patients' statements. A sample of 29 patients in a medical clinic reporting SRA found no corroboration of the claims in medical records or in discussion with family members. and a survey of 2,709 American therapists found the majority of allegations of SRA came from only sixteen therapists, suggesting that the determining factor in a patient making allegations of SRA was the therapist's predisposition. Further, the alleged similarities between patient accounts (particularly between adults and children) turned out to be illusory upon review, with adults describing far more elaborate, severe and bizarre abuse than children. Bette Bottoms, who reviewed hundreds of claims of adult and child abuse, described the ultimate evidence for the abuse as "astonishingly weak and ambiguous" particularly given the severity of the alleged abuse. Therapists however, were found to believe patients more as the allegations became more bizarre and severe.

In cases in which patients made claims that were physically impossible, or in cases in which the evidence which was found by police is contradictory, the details which are reported will often change. If patients pointed to a spot where a body was buried, but no body was found and no earth was disturbed, therapists resort to special pleading, saying that the patient was hypnotically programmed to direct investigators to the wrong location, or the patient was fooled by the cult into believing that a crime was not committed. If the alleged bodies were cremated and police point out that ordinary fires are inadequate to completely destroy a body, stories include special industrial furnaces. The patients' allegations change, and they creatively find "solutions" to objections.

=== Children's allegations ===
The second group to make allegations of SRA were young children. During the "Satanic Panic" of the 1980s, the techniques used by investigators to gather evidence from witnesses, particularly young children, evolved to become very leading, coercive and suggestive, pressuring young children to provide testimony and refusing to accept denials while offering inducements that encouraged false disclosures. The interviewing techniques used were the factors believed to have led to the construction of the bizarre disclosures of SRA by the children and changes to forensic and interviewing techniques since that time has resulted in a disappearance of the allegations. Analysis of the techniques used in two key cases (the McMartin Preschool and Wee Care Nursery School trials) concluded that the children were questioned in a highly suggestive manner. Compared with a set of interviews from Child Protective Services, the interviews from the two trials were "significantly more likely to (a) introduce new suggestive information into the interview, (b) provide praise, promises, and positive reinforcement, (c) express disapproval, disbelief, or disagreement with children, (d) exert conformity pressure, and (e) invite children to pretend or speculate about supposed events".

Specific allegations from the cases included:

- Seeing witches fly; travel in a hot air balloon; abuse and travel through tunnels; identifying actor Chuck Norris from a series of pictures as an abuser; orgies at car washes and airports, children being flushed down toilets to secret rooms where they would be abused, then cleaned up and presented back to their unsuspecting parents (McMartin preschool trial, no forensic evidence was found to support these claims)
- Being raped with knives (including a 12-inch blade), sticks, forks, and magic wands; assault by a clown in a magic room; being forced to drink urine; tied naked to a tree (Fells Acres day care sexual abuse trial; no forensic evidence was found to support these claims)
- Ritual murder of babies; children taken out on boats and thrown overboard; trips in hot air balloons; babies were thrown against walls; children were penetrated with knives and forks; the walls and floors of the center's music room were spread with urine and feces (Little Rascals day care sexual abuse trial; no forensic evidence was found to support these claims)
- Forced to act in child pornography and used for child prostitution; tortured; made to watch snuff films (Kern County child abuse cases; no child pornography was ever found to substantiate these accusations)
- The mentally disabled abuser with Noonan syndrome drank human blood in satanic rituals; abducted the children despite being unable to drive; forced the children to eat urine and feces; abducted the children to secret rooms; committed violent sexual assaults and beatings; killed a giraffe, rabbit and elephant and drank their blood in front of the children. (Faith Chapel Church ritual abuse case; no forensic evidence was found to support these claims)

A variety of these allegations resulted in criminal convictions; in an analysis of these cases Mary de Young found that many had had their convictions overturned. Of 22 daycare employees and their sentences reviewed in 2007, three were still incarcerated, eleven had charges dismissed or overturned, and eight were released before serving their full sentences. Grounds included technical dismissals, constitutional challenges and prosecutorial misconduct.

== Skepticism ==
=== As a moral panic ===
SRA and "Satanic Panic" have been called a moral panic and compared to the blood libel and witch-hunts of historical Europe, and McCarthyism in the United States during the 20th century. Stanley Cohen, who originated the term moral panic, called the episode "one of the purest cases of moral panic". The initial investigations of SRA were performed by anthropologists and sociologists, who failed to find evidence of SRA actually occurring; instead they concluded that SRA was a result of rumors and folk legends that were spread by "media hype, Christian fundamentalism, mental health and law enforcement professionals and child abuse advocates". Sociologists and journalists noted the vigorous nature with which some evangelical activists and groups were using claims of SRA to further their religious and political goals. Other commentators suggested that the entire phenomenon may be evidence of a moral panic over Satanism and child abuse. After skeptical inquiry, explanations for allegations of SRA have included an attempt by radical feminists to undermine the nuclear family, a backlash against working women, homophobic attacks on gay childcare workers, a universal need to believe in evil, fear of alternative spiritualities, "end of the millennium" anxieties, or a transient form of temporal lobe epilepsy.

In his book Satanic Panic, the 1994 Mencken Award winner for Best Book presented by the Free Press Association, Jeffery Victor wrote that, in the United States, the groups most likely to believe rumors of SRA are rural, poorly educated, religiously conservative, blue-collar families with an unquestioning belief in American values who feel significant anxieties over job loss, economic decline and family disintegration. Victor considered rumors of SRA a symptom of a moral crisis and a form of scapegoating for economic and social ills.

According to Mary de Young, the Satanic ritual abuse panic was fundamentally a morality tale in which evil persecutes innocence, and heroic rescuers drive evil away in a persecutor–victim–rescuer triangle.

=== Origins of the rumors ===
Information about SRA claims spread through conferences presented to religious groups, churches and professionals such as police forces and therapists as well as parents. These conferences and presentations served to organize agencies and foster communication between groups, maintaining and spreading disproven or exaggerated stories as fact. Members of local police forces organized into loose networks focused on cult crimes, some of whom billed themselves as "experts" and were paid to speak at conferences throughout the United States. Religious revivalists also took advantage of the rumors and preached about the dangers of Satanism to youth and presented themselves at paid engagements as secular experts. At the height of the panic, the highly emotional accusations and circumstances of SRA allegations made it difficult to investigate the claims, with the accused being assumed as guilty and skeptics becoming co-accused during trials, and trials moving forward based solely on the testimony of very young children without corroborating evidence. No forensic or corroborating evidence has ever been found for religiously based cannibalistic or murderous SRA, despite extensive investigations. The concern and reaction expressed by various groups regarding the seriousness or threat of SRA has been considered out-of-proportion to the actual threat by satanically motivated crimes, and the rare crime that exists that may be labeled "satanic" does not equate to the existence of a conspiracy or network of religiously motivated child abusers.

=== Scholarly and law enforcement investigations ===
Jeffrey Victor reviewed 67 rumors about SRA in the United States and Canada reported in newspapers or television and found no evidence supporting the existence of murderous satanic cults. LaFontaine states that cases of alleged SRA investigated in the United Kingdom were reviewed in detail and the majority were unsubstantiated; three were found to involve sexual abuse of children in the context of rituals, but none involved the Witches' Sabbath or devil worship that are characteristic of allegations of SRA. LaFontaine also states that no material evidence has been forthcoming in allegations of SRA; no bones, bodies or blood, in either the United States or Britain.

Kenneth Lanning, an FBI expert in the investigation of child sexual abuse, has stated that pseudo-Satanism may exist but there is "little or no evidence for ... large-scale baby breeding, human sacrifice, and organized satanic conspiracies":

There are many possible alternative answers to the question of why victims are alleging things that don't seem to be true. ... I believe that there is a middle ground—a continuum of possible activity. Some of what the victims allege may be true and accurate, some may be misperceived or distorted, some may be screened or symbolic, and some may be "contaminated" or false. The problem and challenge, especially for law enforcement, is to determine which is which. This can only be done through active investigation. I believe that the majority of victims alleging "ritual" abuse are in fact victims of some form of abuse or trauma.

Lanning produced a monograph in 1994 on SRA aimed at child protection authorities, which contained his opinion that despite hundreds of investigations no corroboration of SRA had been found. Following this report, several convictions based on SRA allegations were overturned and the defendants released.

Reported cases of SRA involve bizarre activities, some of which are impossible (like people flying), that makes the credibility of victims of child sexual abuse questionable. In cases where SRA is alleged to occur, Lanning describes common dynamics of the use of fear to control multiple young victims, the presence of multiple perpetrators and strange or ritualized behaviors, though allegations of crimes such as human sacrifice and cannibalism do not seem to be true. Lanning also suggests several reasons why adult victims may make allegations of SRA, including "pathological distortion, traumatic memory, normal childhood fears and fantasies, misperception, and confusion".

== Court cases ==
Allegations of SRA have appeared throughout the world. In 1984, a large scale investigation and prosecution of ritual abuse in Jordan, Minnesota drew national attention for poor investigative and prosecutorial practices. A group of parents named Victims of Child Abuse Laws grew and gained political power. The testimony of children in these cases may have led to their collapse, as juries came to believe that the sources of the allegations were the use of suggestive and manipulative interviewing techniques, rather than actual events. Research since that time has supported these concerns and without the use of these techniques it is unlikely the cases would ever have reached trial.

In one analysis of 36 court cases involving sexual abuse of children within rituals, only one quarter resulted in convictions, all of which had little to do with ritual sex abuse. In a survey of more than 11,000 psychiatric and police workers throughout the US, conducted for the National Center on Child Abuse and Neglect, researchers investigated approximately 12,000 accusations of ritual or religious abuse between 1980 and 1990. The survey found no substantiated reports of well-organized satanic rings of people who sexually abuse children, but did find incidents in which the ritualistic aspects were secondary to the abuse and were used to intimidate victims. Victor reviewed 21 court cases alleging SRA between 1983 and 1987 in which no prosecutions were obtained for ritual abuse.

During the early 1980s, some courts attempted ad hoc accommodations to address the anxieties of child witnesses in relation to testifying before defendants. Screens or CCTV technology are a common feature of child sexual assault trials today; children in the early 1980s were typically forced into direct visual contact with the accused abuser while in court. SRA allegations in the courts catalyzed a broad agenda of research into the nature of children's testimony and the reliability of their oral evidence in court. Ultimately in SRA cases, the coercive techniques used by believing district attorneys, therapists and police officers were critical in establishing, and often resolving, SRA cases. In courts, when juries were able to see recordings or transcripts of interviews with children, the alleged abusers were acquitted. The reaction by successful prosecutors, spread throughout conventions and conferences on SRA, was to destroy, or fail to take notes of the interviews in the first place. One group of researchers concluded that children usually lack the sufficient amount of "explicit knowledge" of satanic ritual abuse to fabricate all of the details of an SRA claim on their own. However, the same researchers also concluded that children usually have the sufficient amount of general knowledge of "violence and the occult" to "serve as a starting point from which ritual claims could develop".

In 2006, psychologist and attorney Christopher Barden drafted an amicus curiae brief to the Supreme Court of California signed by nearly 100 international experts in the field of human memory emphasizing the lack of credible scientific support for repressed and recovered memories.

== Dissociative identity disorder ==
SRA has been linked to dissociative identity disorder (DID, formerly known as multiple personality disorder or MPD), with some DID patients also alleging cult abuse. The first person to write a first-person narrative about SRA was Michelle Smith, co-author of Michelle Remembers; Smith was diagnosed with DID by her therapist and later husband Lawrence Pazder. According to Pazder’s then wife, Pazder saw the television film based on the (later discredited) book Sybil about a woman with MPD, and said that he had a similar patient. This was the initial seed of the story that became Michelle Remembers. Psychiatrists involved with the International Society for the Study of Trauma and Dissociation (ISSTD, then called the International Society for the Study of Multiple Personality and Dissociation), especially associate editor Bennett G. Braun, uncritically promoted the idea that actual groups of persons who worshiped Satan were abusing and ritually sacrificing children and, furthermore, that thousands of persons were recovering actual memories of such abuse during therapy, openly discussing such claims in the organization's journal, Dissociation. In a 1989 editorial, Dissociation editor-in-chief Richard Kluft likened clinicians who did not speak of their patients with recovered memories of SRA to the "good Germans" during the Holocaust. One particularly controversial article found parallels between SRA accounts and pre-Inquisition historical records of satanism, hence claimed to find support for the existence of ancient and intergenerational satanic cults. A review of these claims by sociologist Mary de Young in a 1994 Behavioral Sciences and the Law article noted that the historical basis for these claims, and in particular their continuity of cults, ceremonies and rituals was questionable. However at an ISSTD conference in November 1990, psychiatrist and researcher Frank Putnam, then chief of the Dissociative Disorders Unit of the National Institute of Mental Health in Bethesda, Maryland, led a plenary session panel that proved to be the first public presentation of psychiatric, historical and law enforcement skepticism concerning SRA claims. Other members of the panel included psychiatrist George Ganaway, anthropologist Sherrill Mulhern, and psychologist Richard Noll. Putnam, a skeptic, was viewed by SRA advocates in attendance as using fellow skeptics such as Noll and Mulhern as allies in a disinformation campaign to split the SRA-believing community.

A survey of 12,000 cases of alleged ritual or religious abuse found that most were diagnosed with DID as well as post-traumatic stress disorder. The level of dissociation in a sample of women alleging SRA was found to be higher than a comparable sample of non-SRA peers, approaching the levels shown by patients diagnosed with DID. A sample of patients diagnosed with DID and reporting childhood SRA also present other symptoms including "dissociative states with satanic overtones, severe post-traumatic stress disorder, survivor guilt, bizarre self abuse, unusual fears, sexualization of sadistic impulses, indoctrinated beliefs, and substance abuse". Commenting on the study, Philip Coons stated that patients were held together in a ward dedicated to dissociative disorders with ample opportunity to socialize, and that the memories were recovered through the use of hypnosis (which he considered questionable). No cases were referred to law enforcement for verification, nor was verification attempted through family members. Coons also pointed out that existing injuries could have been self-inflicted, that the experiences reported were "strikingly similar" and that "many of the SRA reports developed while patients were hospitalized". The reliability of memories of DID clients who alleged SRA in treatment has been questioned and a point of contention in the popular media and with clinicians; many of the allegations made are fundamentally impossible and alleged survivors lack the physical scars that would result were their allegations true.

Many women claiming to be SRA survivors have been diagnosed with DID, and it is unclear if their claims of childhood abuse are accurate or a manifestation of their diagnosis. Of a sample of 29 patients who presented with SRA, 22 were diagnosed with dissociative disorders including DID. The authors noted that 58 percent of the SRA claims appeared in the years following the Geraldo Rivera special on SRA and a further 34 percent following a workshop on SRA presented in the area; in only two patients were the memories elicited without the use of "questionable therapeutic practices for memory retrieval". Claims of SRA by DID patients have been called "...often nothing more than fantastic pseudomemories implanted or reinforced in psychotherapy" and SRA a cultural script of the perception of DID. Some believe that memories of SRA are solely iatrogenically implanted memories from suggestive therapeutic techniques, though this has been criticized by Daniel Brown, Alan Scheflin and Corydon Hammond for what they argue as over-reaching the scientific data that supports an iatrogenic theory. Others have criticized Hammond specifically for using therapeutic techniques to gather information from clients that rely solely on information fed by the therapist in a manner that highly suggests iatrogenesis. Skeptics said that the increase in DID diagnosis in the 1980s and 1990s and its association with memories of SRA is evidence of malpractice by treating professionals.

Much of the body of literature on the treatment of ritually abused patients focuses on dissociative disorders.

== False memories ==
One explanation for the SRA allegations is that they were based upon false memories caused by use of discredited suggestive techniques such as hypnosis and leading questions by therapists underestimating the suggestibility of their clients. The altered state of consciousness induced by hypnosis rendered patients an unusual ability to produce confabulations, often with the assistance of their therapists.

Paul R. McHugh, professor of psychiatry at Johns Hopkins University, discusses in his book Try to Remember the developments that led to the creation of false memories in the SRA moral panic and the formation of the FMSF as an effort to bring contemporary scientific research and political action to the polarizing struggle about false memories within the mental health disciplines. According to McHugh, there is no coherent scientific basis for the core belief of one side of the struggle, that sexual abuse can cause massive systemic repression of memories that can only be accessed through hypnosis, coercive interviews and other dubious techniques. The group of psychiatrists who promoted these ideas, whom McHugh terms "Mannerist Freudians", consistently followed a deductive approach to diagnosis in which the theory and causal explanation of symptoms was assumed to be childhood sexual abuse leading to dissociation, followed by a set of unproven and unreliable treatments with a strong confirmation bias that inevitably produced the allegations and causes that were assumed to be there.

The treatment approach involved isolation of the patient from friends and family within psychiatric wards dedicated to the treatment of dissociation, filled with other patients who were treated by the same doctors with the same flawed methods and staff members who also coherently and universally ascribed to the same set of beliefs. These methods began in the 1980s and continued for several years until a series of court cases and medical malpractice lawsuits resulted in hospitals failing to support the approach. In cases where the dissociative symptoms were ignored, the coercive treatment approach ceased and the patients were removed from dedicated wards, allegations of satanic rape and abuse normally ceased, "recovered" memories were identified as fabrications and conventional treatments for presenting symptoms were generally successful.

== See also ==
- 764 (organization) – Online sextortion network, uses corresponding Satanic symbolism, but with minimal genuine belief in Satanism
- Backmasking – Backward recording technique
- Carl Raschke – American philosopher (born 1944), academic, author, and "expert witness" who was prominent in Satanic ritual abuse claims during the late 1980s and early 1990s
- Fall River murders – 1979–1980 murders in Massachusetts, USA
- False accusation of rape § Justification for lynchings
- False allegation of child sexual abuse – Accusation of child molestation when it has not actually occurred
- List of abuse allegations made through facilitated communication
- List of conspiracy theories § Paganism
- Misery literature – Literature depicting suffering
- National Society for the Prevention of Cruelty to Children – British child protection charity
- Order of Nine Angles – Satanic and left-hand path occultist group
- Outreau case – 2004 French child sexual abuse trial
- Pizzagate conspiracy theory – Debunked conspiracy theory about alleged child sex ring
- Playing with Fire (Weldon and Bjornstad book) – Christian anti-role-playing-game book
- Regression – 2015 film by Alejandro Amenábar
- West Memphis Three – Men convicted of 1993 murders in Arkansas, United States
- Witch trials in the early modern period – Prosecutions for witchcraft in Europe
