= List of satanic ritual abuse allegations =

During the 1980s and 1990s, a moral panic about alleged satanic ritual abuse occurred, mainly in parts of the English-speaking world. This was propagated by certain psychotherapists, social workers, Christian fundamentalists, and law enforcement officials.

Some of the cases ended in prosecution and imprisonment; all but one of those imprisoned have been released. Australia, the United Kingdom, and the United States have had several incidents of alleged satanic ritual abuse which received national and international news coverage. Other countries have also had isolated events in which abuse or murder took place with satanic ritual elements, including Argentina and Brazil.

== Australia ==
=== Perth, Western Australia ===
In 1991, police in Perth linked Scott Gozenton, a self-professed satanist, with organised child sexual abuse. His lawyer claimed 13 satanic covens existed in the area, holding bizarre orgies involving children, and that Gozenton had been followed and threatened by "coven" members throughout the court proceedings.

=== Central Coast, New South Wales ===
In 1999, two journalists from The Sun-Herald claimed to have seen evidence of the ritual abuse of children. They interviewed six mothers whose children had disclosed experiences of satanic ritual abuse and organised abuse in New South Wales. The children's disclosures were corroborating, although they had never met one another, and they had been able to draw representations of "satanic" ritual sites which were similar to ritual sites uncovered by police on the central coast of New South Wales.

One mother stated that her sons remembered being drugged and hypnotised. "He said they dressed in black robes and had eye and mouth pieces cut out," she said. "I know they're dangerous people. I have had warnings outside the house telling me to stop investigations. We're fearful for our lives. The boys never want me out of their sight."

== Belgium ==
During the investigation of the Belgian serial killer Marc Dutroux, a number of women approached police claiming to be adult survivors of a network of sexual offenders. One witness described satanic ceremonies with a goal of disorienting new victims, causing them to doubt the reality of their memories and prevent disclosure.

== Brazil ==
In the early 1990s, Superior Universal Alignment, an Argentinian-based international cult, was implicated in the ritualistic murders of several children.

A number of prominent citizens were arrested in relation to the murders, and it later emerged that they had paid the cult to conduct the murderous ceremonies. A search of cult members' homes turned up cult registers, guns, hooded cloaks, 100 videotapes of cult ceremonies, and satanist publications, including a 200-page book by cult leader Valentina de Andrade called God, the Great Farce. Brazilian authorities suggested that the cult was connected to satanic groups internationally.

In 2003, five members of the Superior Universal Alignment cult in the Amazonian town of Altamira were convicted for the ritualistic murders of three children and the castration of two others. The victims were aged between eight and thirteen years, and they were kidnapped, tortured, or killed between 1989 and 1993. Their genitals were removed and used in satanic rituals by 75-year-old village clairvoyant Valentina de Andrade, the leader of the Superior Universal Alignment cult. De Andrade had previously been sought by police in Argentina and Uruguay prior to her arrest in Brazil on suspicion of involvement in other satanic ritual killings.

Following the castration of victims, two doctors involved in the sect removed the victim's other organs for sale on the international black market. Other people sentenced in relation to the murders included a former police officer, a businessman, and the son of an influential landowner. The charges related to the murders of three young children and the attempted murder of another; however, victims' families say that there were at least nineteen other murdered children. The cult is based in Argentina and has branches in Holland.

== Canada ==
One of the earliest claims of satanic ritual abuse was made in the book Michelle Remembers, co-written by Canadian psychiatrist Lawrence Pazder and Michelle Smith, later Pazder's wife. The book detailed a satanic cult that allegedly operated in Victoria, British Columbia.

A protracted child custody case contested in family court in Hamilton, Ontario, from 1985 to 1987, centred on allegations of satanic ritual abuse; it was later documented in a book written by a Globe and Mail reporter who was assigned to cover the case.

The Martensville satanic sex scandal occurred in Martensville, Saskatchewan, in 1992, where an allegation of day care sexual abuse hysteria escalated into claims of satanic ritual abuse.

== Ireland ==
In 2007, a jury at Dublin County Coroners Court unanimously ruled that an infant found stabbed to death over three decades ago was the daughter of Cynthia Owen (then 'Sindy Murphy'). The infant was alleged to have been murdered by the infant's grandmother. The Minister of Justice, Equality and Law Reform had previously rejected a request by Cynthia Owen to have the body of the child exhumed, a decision Owen did not contest. The inquest was prohibited from assigning blame due to the Coroners Act of 1962 and therefore returned an open verdict. Also, the jury was instructed that the standard of proof was not the "beyond a reasonable doubt" benchmark of criminal trials but rather the lesser standard of determining whether Owen's claims were true based "on the balance of probabilities". Ms. Owen made claims about a stillborn second child buried in the family garden, but police found no human remains after digging up the plot. Owen's parents, as well as her older siblings, denied her allegations of abuse.

During the trial, Owen provided her account of incest, organised abuse, and satanic ritual abuse orchestrated by her parents involving at least nine other men, and her account was supported by her psychologist. She claimed that her brother, Michael, and sister, Theresa, were also abused, a charge that was denied by her older brother and father. One of the alleged abusers is Cynthia Owen's older brother, Peter Murphy Junior, while the father, Peter Murphy Senior, is also an alleged abuser. One brother, Martin, committed suicide in 1995 after revealing he had been sodomised in his family home, while another brother, Michael, disappeared in 2002, and sister Theresa committed suicide shortly after the discovery of his body in 2005; Theresa's detailed 37-page suicide note corroborated Cynthia's account. A friend of Theresa's testified at the trial, stating that Theresa had spoken to him at length about her sexual abuse in childhood. Theresa Murphy committed suicide on February 24, 2005, as a result of childhood sexual abuse, a finding that was supported by police evidence. Theresa was the child of her older sister, Margaret Murphy.

Following the findings of the Coroner's Court, Owen has raised questions regarding the disposal of her daughter's body and the failure of the police to investigate the murder. In particular, she has highlighted the fact that no blood or tissue samples were kept, that the bag and sanitary towels found alongside the murdered child have gone missing, that the records of the first inquest into the murder have gone missing, and that her daughter was buried in a mass grave alongside other infants. Owen claimed that the police knew about the murder and did nothing. She also stated that she felt robbed of justice by her mother's natural and peaceful death.

Owen's father, Peter Murphy Senior, and three of her sisters won the right to appeal the findings of the inquest from the High Court. The family claimed that the coroner was biased toward Owen, shielded her when giving evidence, and was selective in the evidence presented to the jury. The case of the murdered child was reported in 2008, and in 2013, it became the subject of an ongoing investigation by the Garda Síochána. A petition calling for further investigation received 10,256 signatures and was submitted to government authorities on April 3, 2014.

Peter Murphy Senior has since died.

== Italy ==
In 1998, six adults in Emilia-Romagna were arrested with allegations of prostituting their children and the production of child pornography. The children were also reported to be involved in satanic rituals.

In 2002, four people were arrested for "satanism and paedophilia" in Pescara. Police believed that the group may have abused dozens of children in rituals involving bodies stolen from ceremonies. In 2006, five members of the cult "Beasts of Satan" were jailed for three ritualistic murders. The victims included the girlfriend of the cult leader, a young runaway who had joined the group, and a woman apparently intended as a human sacrifice. Police speculated that the cult may have killed the two members for attempting to save the life of the woman they planned to sacrifice. Victims were shot, stabbed, and buried alive.

In April 2007, six people were arrested for sexually abusing fifteen children in Rignano Flaminio. The suspects were accused of filming the children engaged in sexual acts with 'satanic' overtones.

== New Zealand ==
In September 1991, a conference in Christchurch included a workshop on satanic ritual abuse run by a member of the Ritual Action Group. Immediately after the conference, the print and TV media started a moral panic about alleged ritual abuse of children. Repeated newsmedia articles on satanic abuse and a report that police were searching for a near-mythical pornography-paedophile ring that was never found but supposedly involved high-profile people in Christchurch, preceded the arrest of Peter Ellis, a child-care worker at the Christchurch Civic Crèche in March 1992. He was found guilty in June 1993 on 16 counts of sexual abuse against children and served seven years in jail. Four female co-workers were also arrested on 15 charges of abuse but were released after the charges were dropped. Peter Ellis consistently denied any abuse until his death in 2019. The case is still considered controversial by many New Zealanders and remains on appeal to the Supreme Court.

In 1994, Wellington Hospital worker Geoffrey David Scott was jailed on eight of 20 charges of child sexual abuse and sentenced to seven years. The allegations were made in 1991 and 1992. The case had none of the bizarre allegations of the Ellis case but was based on now-unacceptable repeated questioning of children and the testimony of Karen Zelas, the controversial psychiatrist who testified in the Ellis trial.

== Netherlands ==
In 1989, a group of parents published allegations in a conservative magazine that their children had witnessed satanic ritual abuse and had been ritually abused from May 1987 until October 1988 in Oude Pekela, a city in the north-eastern province of Groningen, the Netherlands. During the initial investigation, only the non-ritual aspects were reported in the press and investigated by the authorities, and the allegations were unconfirmed.

In 1989, the conservative Christian news program Tijdsein reported allegations that included satanic ritual abuse, to which there was no official response. After attending a conference in which the concept of satanic ritual abuse was discussed, Oude Pekela general practitioners Fred Jonker and Ietje Jonker-Bakker alleged that several children had been abused by unknown men in the context of satanic rituals. This was first reported in a lecture at the Institute of Education of London University and later published in several academic journals in both English and Dutch, but their findings were heavily criticised by American and Dutch scholars.

National authorities were informed in 1991 and 1992 of the allegations, though no action was taken until the press was informed. The State Secretary of Justice responded to the allegations by appointing the Werkgroep Ritueel Misbruik multidisciplinary workgroup to study satanic ritual abuse in the Netherlands, which produced a report in 1994. The report concluded that it was unlikely satanic ritual abuse had occurred or the allegations were factually true, suggested the allegations were a defence mechanism produced in part by suggestive questioning by 'believing' therapists, and that the stories were contemporary legends dispersed through a network of therapists and patients who were concerned with dissociative identity disorder.

== South Africa ==
=== Van Rooyen case ===
In 1990, Gert van Rooyen and his accomplice were accused of murdering several young girls, ultimately committing suicide while running from the police. One of the accused's sons was later himself accused of murdering a Zimbabwean girl in 1991; the same son claimed his father's victims were involved in international child pornography rings, slavery, and satanism rituals, but no evidence of this was found. The case was so similar to crimes committed by Marc Dutroux that multiple agencies investigated a possible international smuggling ring in prostituted children and body parts.

== United Kingdom ==
There have been a number of cases in the United Kingdom in which satanic ritual abuse has been alleged. Some of these cases have garnered significant media attention and are listed below.

The National Society for the Prevention of Cruelty to Children documented allegations of ritual abuse in 1990, with the publication of survey findings that, of 66 child protection teams in England, Wales, and Northern Ireland, 14 teams had received reports of ritual abuse from children, and seven of them were working directly with children who had been ritually abused, sometimes in groups of 20. An investigation into satanic ritual abuse allegations by the British government produced over two hundred reports, of which only three were substantiated and proved to be examples of pseudosatanism, in which sexual abuse was the actual motivation and the rituals were incidental.

=== Rochdale ===
In 1990, there was a case in Rochdale in which around twenty children were removed from their homes by social services, who alleged the existence of satanic ritual abuse after discovering 'satanic indicators'. No evidence was found of satanic apparatus, and charges were dismissed when a court ruled the allegations were untrue. The children who were removed from their homes sued the city council in 2006 for compensation and an apology. Richard Scorer acted for five of the families.

=== Orkney ===
In 1990 and 1991, nine children suspected of being sexually abused by their families and an alleged child abuse ring were removed by social services in Orkney. The abuse was also alleged to involve "ritualistic elements". The parents approached the media and made the case national and international news. In April 1991, a sheriff ruled that the evidence was seriously flawed and the children were returned home.

In June, social services appealed the sheriff's ruling but the appeal was overturned, and an official inquiry was established in August 1991, which, after nine months' investigation at a cost of £6 million, published its report in October 1992. It described the dismissal of the first judgment as "most unfortunate" and criticized all those involved, including the social workers, the police, and the Orkney Islands Council. Social workers' training, methods, and judgment were given special condemnation, and the report stated that the concept of "ritual abuse" was "not only unwarrantable at present but may affect the objectivity of practitioners and parents". A 1994 government report based on three years of research found that there was no foundation to any of the satanic abuse claims.

=== Broxtowe ===
In October 1987 children were removed from their families in Nottingham, and in February 1989 a Broxtowe family was charged with multigenerational child sexual abuse and neglect. A 600-page report on the incident concluded that there was no evidence of the satanic ritual abuse claims made by children or corroborating adults. Though the children may have been 'sadistically terrorized', allegations of organized satanic abuse were found to be baseless, and the indicators used by the Social Services department were without validity.

=== Lewis ===
In 2003, allegations by three children in Lewis, Scotland, resulted in the arrest of eight people for sexual abuse occurring between 1990 and 2000. A 2005 investigation by the Social Work Inspection Agency found extensive evidence of sexual, physical, and emotional abuse and neglect. Police investigation resulted in allegations of an island-wide "satanic paedophile ring", though charges were dropped nine months later following an inconclusive investigation.

A key witness who had implicated her family in the abuse and whose evidence was "vital" to the case of satanic abuse recanted her testimony in 2006 and the media raised questions about the nature of the police interviewing techniques, with a police spokesperson replying that the witness was questioned appropriately and that allegations were made by numerous witnesses.

=== Kidwelly ===
In March 2011, four adults who lived in a cul-de-sac in the Welsh town of Kidwelly were convicted of multiple sex offences against children and young adults. The group led by Colin Batley was described by the media as a "satanic sex cult", a "quasi-religious sex cult" and a "paedophile cult". The prosecution said they practised "free sex" and were influenced by Aleister Crowley, a practitioner of ceremonial magic who founded the belief system of Thelema. They dressed in hoods and read from Crowley's The Book of the Law, the central text of Thelema, and some victims were made to wear inverted crosses. Members of the cult were initiated in a ceremony involving sex with an adult, and they were threatened with being killed if they did not take part in the ceremony. Some of the victims were forced into prostitution.

=== Hampstead, London ===
The Hampstead Hoax was a series of false accusations originally made in 2014, alleging that a satan-worshipping paedophile ring of about "175 parents, teachers and religious leaders" were sexually abusing, killing, and eating children and babies in the Hampstead area of north London. Police found no evidence of any crime, and the two accusing children soon admitted they had lied under duress after their stepfather, who had threatened and forced them to make up the stories. The video of the children's accusations was posted online by a friend of the children's mother, and the accused abusers were subject to harassment, death threats, and online abuse, which continued at least until 2022. The original accuser, the children's mother, ended up fleeing to Spain, and the woman who helped post the videos was convicted of four counts of harassment and stalking and six counts of violating a restraining order and sentenced to nine years in jail.

== United States ==
In the United States, major allegations of satanic ritual abuse occurred in the Kern County child abuse cases, the McMartin preschool trial, and the West Memphis Three, which garnered worldwide media coverage. It was eventually determined that no satanic abuse took place in these cases but that the allegations were due to false testimony and police misconduct. But no governor ever pardoned a prisoner falsely accused of ritual abuse, and Frank Fuster remains imprisoned on such charges. One of the most recent debunked allegations of satanic ritual abuse in the United States was the Pizzagate conspiracy theory.

=== Minnesota ===
The first such case occurred in Jordan, Minnesota, in 1983, where several children made allegations against an unrelated man and their parents. The man confessed and then identified a number of the children's parents as perpetrators. Ultimately, twenty-four adults were charged with child abuse, though only three went to trial with two acquittals and one conviction. During the investigation, the children made allegations regarding the manufacturing of child pornography, ritualistic animal sacrifice, coprophagia, urophagia, and infanticide, at which point the Federal Bureau of Investigation was alerted. No criminal charges resulted from the FBI investigation, and in his review of the case, the Attorney General noted that the initial investigation by the local police and county attorney was so poor that it had destroyed the opportunity to fully investigate the children's allegations.

Judge Antonin Scalia referred to the Minnesota case in his summation of a later case and stated, "[t]here is no doubt that some sexual abuse took place in Jordan, but there is no reason to believe it was as widespread as charged," and cited the repeated, well-intentioned but coercive techniques used by the investigators as damaging to the investigation. The bizarre allegations of the children, the ambiguities of the investigation, and the unsuccessful prosecutions were widely covered by the media. A number of accused parents confessed to sexually abusing their children, received immunity, and underwent treatment for sexual abuse, while parental rights for six other children in the case were terminated.

=== Louisiana ===
In December 2007, Austin Trey Bernard was found guilty of raping his son and daughter, convicted on the basis of three previous confessions and a detailed diary of his actions, although he pleaded not guilty. The allegations came to light upon the confession of one of the defendants.

== See also ==
- Medicine murder
- Religious abuse
