= David Finkelhor =

American sociologist (born 1947)

- Born: 1947 (age 78–79)
- Education: Harvard College (BA, 1968) Harvard Graduate School of Education (MEd, 1971) University of New Hampshire (PhD, 1978)
- Known for: Research on child abuse
- Scientific career
- Workplaces: University of New Hampshire
- Thesis: Sexually victimized children and their families (1978)
- Doctoral advisor: Murray A. Straus
- Website: www.unh.edu/ccrc/researchers/finkelhor-david.html

David Finkelhor (born 1947) is an American sociologist known for his research into child sexual abuse and related topics. He is the director of the Crimes against Children Research Center, co-director of the Family Research Laboratory and professor of sociology at the University of New Hampshire.

== Life and career ==
Finkelhor graduated from Phillips Exeter Academy in 1964, then attended Harvard College, where he earned his Bachelor of Arts degree in Social Relations in 1968. While at Harvard, he took courses at the Institut d'Études Politiques, University of Paris in 1967. He earned his M.Ed. in 1971 from the Harvard Graduate School of Education, and he received his Ph.D. in sociology from University of New Hampshire in 1978 where he studied under Murray A. Straus.

Finkelhor is also a senior faculty fellow and Master in Public Policy faculty member at the Carsey School of Public Policy.

Finkelhor began studying the child abuse problems of child victimization, child maltreatment and family violence in 1977. He is known for his conceptual and empirical work on the problem of child sexual abuse, reflected in publications such as Sourcebook on Child Sexual Abuse (Sage, 1986) and Nursery Crimes (Sage, 1988). He has also written about child homicide, missing and abducted children, children exposed to domestic and peer violence and other forms of family violence. His 2008 book, Child Victimization, sought to unify and integrate knowledge about diverse forms of child victimization in a field he has termed "developmental victimology".

Finkelhor has received grants from sources including the National Institute of Mental Health, the National Center on Child Abuse and Neglect, and the US Department of Justice. In 1994, he was given the Distinguished Child Abuse Professional Award by the American Professional Society on the Abuse of Children. In 2004 he was given the Significant Achievement Award from the Association for the Treatment of Sexual Abusers. In 2005 he and his colleagues received the Child Maltreatment Article of the Year award, and in 2007 he was elected as a Fellow of the American Society of Criminology.

Finkelhor researches and has authored many studies, articles, and books on child sexual abuse. He is associated with the model which suggests that there are four preconditions which need to be met in order for child sexual abuse to occur:

1. an offender with a predisposition to sexually abuse a child;
2. the ability to overcome the offender's internal inhibitions against acting on that predisposition;
3. an ability to overcome external barriers, such as lack of access to the child or supervision of the child by others;
4. an ability to overcome any resistance or reluctance on the part of the child.

He has stated that he intends to continue his research until he proves "an unambiguous and persuasive case that the problem [of child sexual abuse] is widespread". According to Ken Plummer, he is "probably the most prominent sociologist at work in the field [of child sexual abuse]".

In 1988 Finkelhor completed an investigation of child sexual abuse in daycares in the United States in response to the satanic ritual abuse panic and co-authored a book with Linda M. Williams. Mary de Young, a sociologist who has written about the moral panic that occurred along with the McMartin preschool trial, criticized the work for a lack of verifiable evidence and incorrect conclusions. It was also cited by Bruce Rind in his controversial work that concluded that the harm caused by child sexual abuse was not necessarily intense or pervasive.
