= Indictment: The McMartin Trial =

- Genre: Drama; Thriller
- Written by: Abby Mann; Myra Mann
- Directed by: Mick Jackson
- Starring: James Woods; Mercedes Ruehl; Henry Thomas; Shirley Knight; Sada Thompson; Lolita Davidovich
- Composer: Peter Rodgers Melnick
- Country of origin: United States
- Original language: English

Production
- Executive producers: Abby Mann; Oliver Stone; Janet Yang
- Producer: Diana Pokorny
- Production location: Los Angeles
- Cinematography: Rodrigo García
- Editor: Richard A. Harris
- Running time: 131 minutes
- Production companies: HBO Pictures; Ixtlan; Abby Mann Productions; Breakheart Films

Original release
- Network: HBO
- Release: May 20, 1995

Indictment: The McMartin Trial is a 1995 American film made for television that originally aired on HBO on May 20, 1995. Indictment is based on the true story of the McMartin preschool trial.

Oliver Stone and Abby Mann were executive producers of the film, which was directed by Mick Jackson.

The cast includes James Woods and Mercedes Ruehl, as opposing defense and prosecuting attorneys in the McMartin trial. Henry Thomas, Sada Thompson and Shirley Knight co-star as the defendants in the case, with Lolita Davidovitch as a child-abuse therapist whose findings were crucial to the prosecution's case and Roberta Bassin as the mother who initiated the case.

== Summary ==
A defense lawyer defends an average American family from shocking allegations of child abuse and satanic rituals. After seven years and $15 million, the trial ends with the dismissal of all charges. George Freeman is the star witness in the trial. Kee MacFarlane and Wayne Satz are in a romantic relationship. The poster and ads for the movie declare "The charges were so shocking, the truth didn't matter."

== Cast ==
- James Woods as Danny Davis
- Mercedes Ruehl as Lael Rubin
- Lolita Davidovitch as Kee MacFarlane
- Henry Thomas as Ray Buckey
- Sada Thompson as Virginia McMartin
- Shirley Knight as Peggy Buckey
- Alison Elliott as Peggy Ann Buckey
- Roberta Bassin as Judy Johnson
- Mark Blum as Wayne Satz
- Richard Bradford as Ira Reiner
- James Cromwell as Judge Pounders
- Chelsea Field as Christine Johnson
- Richard Portnow as Judge George

== Reception ==
John J. O'Connor, writing for The New York Times:

This is a portrait of mass hysteria, fueled by panic-stricken parents, overzealous prosecutors, irresponsible talk shows and an out-of-control tabloid press ... Is "Indictment" balanced? Is it fair to the other side? No. As Mr. [Abby] Mann puts it, "What other side?" Watch it and shudder.

Also writing for The New York Times, Seth Mydans said:

The film makes no pretense at objectivity: There are good guys in the McMartin saga, and there are very, very bad guys ... Nor does the film try to examine difficult issues. It is a drama not so much about the painful process of assessing children's stories of abuse or about the fear and guilt their parents feel but about the destructiveness of a system run amok.

The Los Angeles Times described the docudrama as "HBO’s frothing, highly opinionated account of the case". Variety reports this "fact-based HBO Pictures presentation ... makes no apologies for depicting the infamous child molestation case as a witch hunt" and leaves "little leeway for surprise. Even so, the well-acted cabler hits its targets with a take-no-prisoners gusto".

== Accolades ==
Year	Award	Category	Nominee(s)	Result	Ref.
1995	CableACE Awards	Movie or Miniseries	Abby Mann, Oliver Stone, Janet Yang, Diana Pokorny, Mick Jackson, and Myra Mann	Nominated	
1995	CableACE Awards	Actor in a Movie or Miniseries	James Woods	Nominated	
1995	CableACE Awards	Actress in a Movie or Miniseries	Mercedes Ruehl	Nominated	
1995	CableACE Awards	Supporting Actress in a Movie or Miniseries	Lolita Davidovitch	Nominated	
1995	CableACE Awards	Supporting Actress in a Movie or Miniseries	Shirley Knight	Nominated	
1995	CableACE Awards	Directing a Movie or Miniseries	Mick Jackson	Nominated	
1995	CableACE Awards	Editing a Dramatic Special or Series/Theatrical Special/Movie or Miniseries	Richard A. Harris	Won	
1995	Primetime Emmy Awards	Outstanding Made for Television Movie	Oliver Stone, Janet Yang, Abby Mann, and Diana Pokorny	Won	
1995	Primetime Emmy Awards	Outstanding Lead Actor in a Miniseries or a Special	James Woods	Nominated	
1995	Primetime Emmy Awards	Outstanding Supporting Actress in a Miniseries or a Special	Shirley Knight	Won (Note: Tied with Judy Davis for Serving in Silence: The Margarethe Cammermeyer Story.)	
1995	Primetime Emmy Awards	Outstanding Supporting Actress in a Miniseries or a Special	Sada Thompson	Nominated	
1995	Primetime Emmy Awards	Outstanding Individual Achievement in Directing for a Miniseries or a Special	Mick Jackson	Nominated	
1995	Primetime Emmy Awards	Outstanding Writing for a Miniseries or a Special	Abby Mann and Myra Mann	Nominated	
1995	Primetime Emmy Awards	Outstanding Individual Achievement in Casting	Mali Finn	Nominated	
1995	Primetime Emmy Awards	Outstanding Individual Achievement in Editing for a Miniseries or a Special – Single Camera Production	Richard A. Harris	Won	
1996	American Cinema Editors Awards	Best Edited Motion Picture for Non-Commercial Television	Richard A. Harris	Won	
1996	Directors Guild of America Awards	Outstanding Directorial Achievement in Dramatic Specials	Mick Jackson	Won	
1996	Edgar Allan Poe Awards	Best Television Feature or Miniseries	Abby Mann and Myra Mann	Won	
1996	Golden Globe Awards	Best Miniseries or Motion Picture Made for Television		Won	
1996	Golden Globe Awards	Best Actor in a Miniseries or Motion Picture Made for Television	James Woods	Nominated	
1996	Golden Globe Awards	Best Supporting Actor in a Series, Miniseries or Motion Picture Made for Television	Henry Thomas	Nominated	
1996	Golden Globe Awards	Best Supporting Actress in a Series, Miniseries or Motion Picture Made for Television	Shirley Knight	Won	
1996	Young Artist Awards	Best Performance by a Young Actor – TV Special	Shane Sweet	Nominated	

== Impact ==
The film is cited as a watershed in the shift of ideas about satanic ritual abuse, recasting Ray Buckey as a victim of a hysterical conspiracy rather than a child abuser.
