= Ed Jagels =

American lawyer (born 1949)

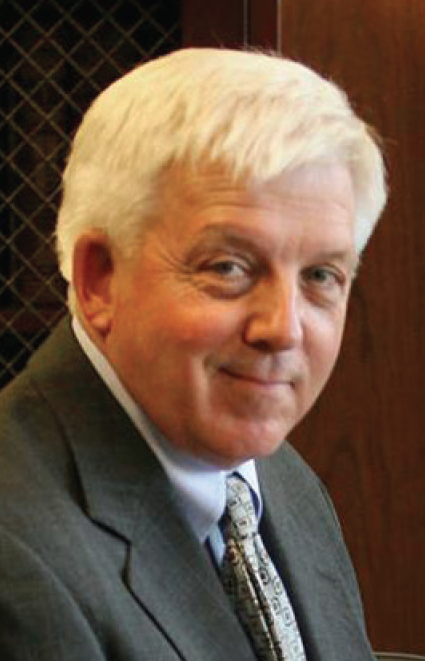

21st Kern County District Attorney
- In office 1983–2010
- Preceded by: Albert Leddy
- Succeeded by: Lisa S. Green

Personal details
- Born: Edward R. Jagels; March 26, 1949 (age 77) Los Angeles, California, U.S.
- Party: Republican
- Education: Stanford University; University of California, Hastings College of the Law
- Occupation: Criminal prosecutor

Edward R. Jagels (born March 26, 1949) is a former American prosecutor and was Kern County, California’s longest-sitting District Attorney, holding the office from 1983 to 2010. During this time, he prosecuted some notorious cases of wrongful convictions, and engaged in what is now acknowledged widely to have been a pattern of prosecutorial misconduct, in which he convicted innocent people of abusing children. Kern County has since paid out $10 million in settlements to the people wrongly convicted by Ed Jagels.

== Early life and education ==
Edward R. Jagels was born on March 26, 1949, in Los Angeles California to George and Margret Jagels. His father, George Daniel Jagels was an attorney. He attended middle school at the Mayfield Junior School in Pasadena, CA. He began high school at the Woodside Priory School in Portola Valley, CA before moving on to the Robert Louis Stevenson high school in Pebble Beach, CA where he graduated in 1967.

He attended Stanford University where he majored in history and joined the Reserve Officers' Training Corps before graduating in 1971. Influenced in part by his father, an attorney, Jagels chose to pursue a career in law at the University of California, Hastings College of Law where he graduated in 1974. While at Hastings, he found an interest in the law of evidence and criminal procedure which lead him to pursue a career in criminal justice and ultimately to the Kern County District Attorney's Office where he would spend the remainder of his career.

== Early career ==
Jagels joined the Kern County District Attorney's Office in 1975 as a deputy district attorney in the misdemeanor unit. In the earliest part of his career, he worked in the misdemeanor and juvenile courts before becoming the East Kern floater deputy, covering the outlying courts in Ridgecrest, Lake Isabella, Tehachapi, and Mojave.

Roughly a year and a half after joining the office, Jagels replaced Frank Hoover as the legal adviser to the Narcotics Task Force (NTF), a joint task force between city and county law enforcement officers designed to combat narcotics trafficking in Kern County. Unlike his predecessors, Jagels took it upon himself to be more than an adviser to the task force, insisting instead that he personally try those cases investigated by the task force.

After leaving the Narcotics Task Force, Jagels partnered with fellow deputy district attorney Steven Tauzer in an effort to improve the quality and consistency of criminal prosecutions within the office. Together, Jagels and Tauzer submitted a proposal to then-District Attorney Albert Leddy for the division of the office into specialized units devoted to particular types of crimes. Until that time, the Kern County District Attorney’s Office had been loosely divided into two primary groups, misdemeanor prosecutors and felony prosecutors with the latter group handling the full range of felony cases from vehicle theft to murder. Their proposal, which was accepted, created four new units, Homicides, Sex Crimes, Narcotics, and Branch Operations with each section specializing in those types of crimes. The restructuring of the office in this way laid the groundwork for the modern structure of the Kern County District Attorney’s Office.

In the early 1980s Jagels was the head of what was then the District Attorneys Association (now the Kern County Prosecutors Association). The association, which operates independently from the District Attorney’s Office itself, is made up of non-managerial deputy district attorneys within the office. As president of that association Jagels organized an office wide effort to collect signatures in support of the Victim’s Bill of Rights initiative which ultimately passed in 1982 adding article I, § 28 to the California Constitution.

== Career ==
Jagels was elected District Attorney of the Kern County District Attorney's Office in 1983. Soon after his election he created a task force to investigate sex crimes against children. The cases eventually brought between 1983 and 1987 involved false claims of satanic ritual abuse performed by eight supposed pedophile groups. The cases, brought without physical evidence, were based solely on the testimony of alleged child victims who had been coached and sometimes tricked into testifying against their parents and other adults. Long prison sentences were obtained against many adults, but the cases began to unravel in the late 1980s as the children recanted their testimony.

Of the 26 convictions, 25 were reversed. One defendant was in prison for 19 years before his conviction was reversed. The county paid out nearly $10 million to settle claims made by the former prisoners and the alleged victims. Actor Sean Penn, who met a man accused of child sex crimes, narrated and served as executive producer for the documentary film, Witch Hunt, concerning the event.

As a "get tough on crime" prosecutor, Jagels was very popular in his conservative town of Bakersfield, California even after his earlier cases unraveled. In the 2000s he prosecuted a man under the three strikes law, which carried a mandatory 25-year prison sentence, for stealing a pack of doughnuts worth less than $1, because the man had been convicted of two felonies in the 1970s. He was unapologetic about the false convictions in the 1980s sex abuse cases, and was re-elected six times as district attorney, before announcing his retirement in 2009. He led a voter campaign to defeat three liberal justices from California's supreme court, and was influential in promoting victims' rights, the death penalty, and California's three strikes law. In 1986, a grand jury released a blistering report on the sex abuse prosecutions, accusing Kern County officials of fostering a "presumption of guilt", concealing exculpatory evidence and bringing charges based on guesswork. California Attorney General John Van de Kamp, a Democrat, released a report that year reaching the same conclusions. By his second term, Jagels had tripled the number of prosecutorial complaints lodged against the District Attorney's office. By 2009, Kern County paid out more than $9 million in wrongful conviction settlements.

On June 1, 2026, Jagels was arrested in Bakersfield, CA on suspicion of driving under the influence of alcohol.
