= Children's Institute Inc. =

Children's Institute, Inc.
- Founded: 1906
- Location: Los Angeles, CA
- Region served: Los Angeles County
- Website: www.childrensinstitute.org

Children's Institute Inc. (CII) is a nonprofit organization that provides services to children and families healing from the effects of family and community violence within Los Angeles. Founded in 1906 by Minnie Barton, Los Angeles's first female probation officer, the organization (then named the Big Sister League) was first designed to help troubled young women who found themselves adrift in Los Angeles. The organization has since expanded its services to at-risk youth in Los Angeles who are affected by child abuse, neglect domestic and gang violence as well as poverty. CII is a multi-service organization that combines evidence-based clinical services, youth development programs and family support services designed to address the whole child and entire family. The organization provides various forms of trauma support—including therapy, intervention services, parenting workshops, early childcare programs and other support services offered in English, Spanish and Korean.

CII currently serves thousands of families throughout Los Angeles County at three main campuses: The Otis Booth campus in the Rampart/Westlake district; the Burton Green Campus in Torrance and the Mid-Wilshire campus near L.A.'s Koreatown. CII also operates a satellite center in Watts and San Pedro/Long Beach. The organization's therapeutic focus is based on the concepts of Recovery, Resilience and Readiness and seeks to help youth build confidence and discover and develop skills to break through barriers—both emotional and situational—to grow up and lead healthy, productive lives.

The Edna McConnell Clark Foundation (EMCF) has invested $10 million in Children's Institute Inc. to date. In 2011, CII received a $5 million, three-year Social Innovation Fund award to expand its presence in the Watts and Central Los Angeles communities. The organization also has received a grant from the Foundation's True North Fund.

In July 2014, the organization announced in a partnership with Pritzker-prize-winning architect Frank Gehry to design a new full-service campus in the Watts community of Los Angeles. The 20,000-square-foot building was opened in 2022.

In the 1980s, the organization played a role in the McMartin preschool trial, interviewing children suspected of being abused using methods that were at the time completely new, and later discredited.

== Programs and services ==
CII is a multi-service agency that utilizes evidence-based practices and an integrated service model offering coordinated prevention, intervention and treatment assistance for children and their families in at-risk neighborhoods across Greater Los Angeles.

The organization provides support in the areas of mental health, individual and family treatment, early care and education, child welfare, family support, youth development and also runs the Leadership Center - a program that trains thousands of professionals a year through conferences and workshops for mental health and children's services professionals, policymakers law enforcement and the like, on a variety of health and family topics that stress best practices. They also run an internship program for psychologists, accredited by the American Psychological Association, and social work interns through the University of Southern California School of Social Work. The organization was recognized as “Agency of the Year” by the USC School of Social Work in May 2014.

CII's family-driven and culturally sensitive programming has been shaped and influenced by the organization's longstanding participation in the National Child Traumatic Stress Network (NCTSN) whose mission is “to raise the standard of care and improve access to services for traumatized children, their families and communities across the nation”.

The organization also works on a variety of community impact projects in partnership with a variety of local, state and national agencies, organizations and schools, including First 5 LA, the Los Angeles Police Department, Harbor-UCLA Medical Center, Los Angeles County Departments of Mental Health and Children and Family Services, and others.

== McMartin preschool trial ==
CII played a major role in the McMartin preschool trial, one of the first and certainly largest criminal trial that was part of the day care sex abuse hysteria and satanic ritual abuse moral panic. Before the trial, CII investigated primarily physical abuse, with a small section that conducted infrequent medical examinations and interviews with children involved in child sexual abuse allegations. Kee MacFarlane, an employee at the center, had the idea to use hand puppets and anatomically correct dolls during interviews with children, believing they would aid disclosure and therapeutic recovery. The initial interviews were taped, and later the sections of the tape in which the children actually made disclosures were shown to parents to convince them their children had been abused. The agency ultimately interviewed more than 350 children who were involved in the trial, using techniques that, when tested, were found to cause children to make false allegations. CII also received $350,000 in state funding in 1985, becoming the first publicly funded training center for the diagnosis and treatment of child abuse. Kee MacFarlane was criticized for her relationship with Wayne Satz, the KABC-TV reporter who first disclosed the accusations against the McMartins.
