= McMartin preschool trial =

1980s day care sexual abuse case

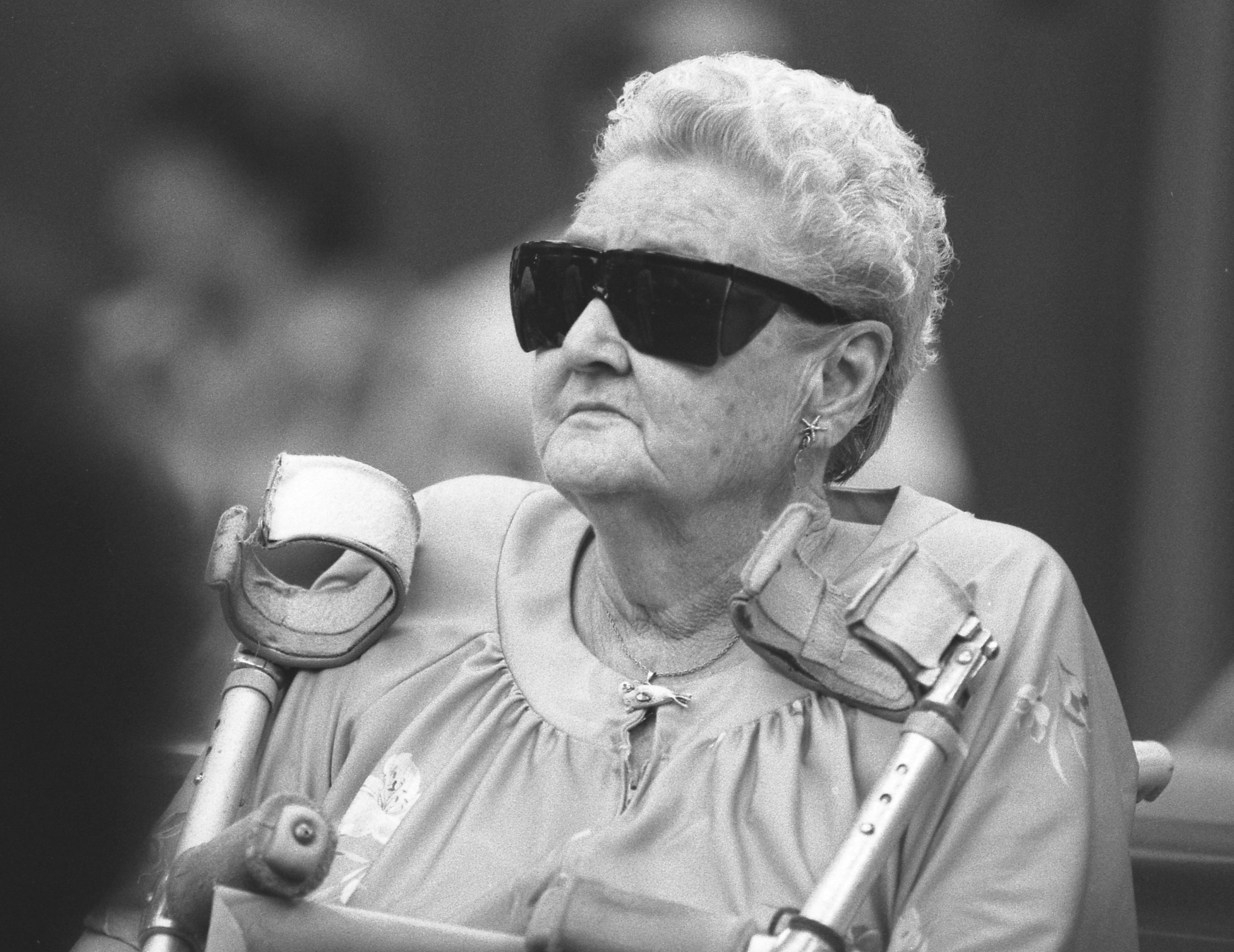
Virginia McMartin during the McMartin preschool trial

The McMartin preschool trial was a day care sexual abuse case in the 1980s, prosecuted by the Los Angeles District Attorney, Ira Reiner. Members of the McMartin family, who operated a preschool in Manhattan Beach, California, were charged with hundreds of acts of sexual abuse of children in their care. Accusations were made in 1983, with arrests and the pretrial investigation taking place from 1984 to 1987, and trials running from 1987 to 1990. The case lasted seven years but resulted in no convictions, and all charges were dropped in 1990. By the case's end, it had become the longest and most expensive series of criminal trials in American history.

A pivotal case during the Satanic panic, the McMartin investigation began when a mother accused a teacher of molesting her son. Authorities and social workers began using highly suggestive interviewing techniques on children at McMartin, resulting in a number of fantastical allegations, including satanic rituals in underground tunnels and hot-air balloons. Over the years, many of the children recanted or contradicted their original allegations, and said they were influenced and coerced by suggestive questioning. The case was pivotal in informing how child abuse investigations are conducted today.

== Initial allegations ==
In 1983, Judy Johnson, mother of one of the preschool's young students, reported to the police that her son had been sodomized by her estranged husband and also by McMartin teacher Ray Buckey. Buckey was the grandson of school founder Virginia McMartin and son of administrator Peggy McMartin Buckey. Johnson's belief that her son had been abused began when her son had painful bowel movements. What happened next is still disputed. Some sources state that at that time, Johnson's son denied her suggestion that his preschool teachers had molested him, whereas others say he confirmed the abuse.

Johnson also made several more accusations, including that people at the daycare had sexual encounters with animals, that "Peggy drilled a child under the arms", and "Ray flew in the air." Buckey was questioned, but was not prosecuted due to lack of evidence. The police then sent a form letter to about 200 parents of students at the McMartin school, stating that their children might have been abused and asking the parents to question their children. The text of the letter read:

September 8, 1983

Dear Parent:
This Department is conducting a criminal investigation involving child molestation (288 P.C.) Ray Buckey, an employee of Virginia McMartin's Pre-School, was arrested September 7, 1983 by this Department.

The following procedure is obviously an unpleasant one, but to protect the rights of your children as well as the rights of the accused, this inquiry is necessary for a complete investigation.

Records indicate that your child has been or is currently a student at the pre-school. We are asking your assistance in this continuing investigation. Please question your child to see if he or she has been a witness to any crime or if he or she has been a victim. Our investigation indicates that possible criminal acts include: oral sex, fondling of genitals, buttock or chest area, and sodomy, possibly committed under the pretense of "taking the child's temperature." Also photos may have been taken of children without their clothing. Any information from your child regarding having ever observed Ray Buckey to leave a classroom alone with a child during any nap period, or if they have ever observed Ray Buckey tie up a child, is important.

Please complete the enclosed information form and return it to this Department in the enclosed stamped return envelope as soon as possible. We will contact you if circumstances dictate same.

We ask you to please keep this investigation strictly confidential because of the nature of the charges and the highly emotional effect it could have on our community. Please do not discuss this investigation with anyone outside your immediate family. Do not contact or discuss the investigation with Raymond Buckey, any member of the accused defendant's family, or employees connected with the McMartin Pre-School.

THERE IS NO EVIDENCE TO INDICATED THAT THE MANAGEMENT OF VIRGINIA MCMARTIN'S PRE-SCHOOL HAD ANY KNOWLEDGE OF THIS SITUATION AND NO DETRIMENTAL INFORMATION CONCERNING THE OPERATION OF THE SCHOOL HAS BEEN DISCOVERED DURING THIS INVESTIGATION. ALSO, NO OTHER EMPLOYEE IN THE SCHOOL IS UNDER INVESTIGATION FOR ANY CRIMINAL ACT.

Johnson was diagnosed with and hospitalized for acute paranoid schizophrenia and, in 1986, was found dead in her home from complications of chronic alcoholism before the preliminary hearing concluded.

== Interviewing and examining the children ==
Several hundred children were then interviewed by the Children's Institute International (CII), a Los Angeles-based abuse therapy clinic run by Kee MacFarlane. The defense alleged that the interviewing techniques used during investigations of the allegations were highly suggestive and invited children to pretend or speculate about supposed events. By spring of 1984, it was claimed that 360 children had been abused. Astrid Heppenstall Heger performed medical examinations and took photos of what she believed to be minute scarring, which she stated was caused by anal penetration. Journalist John Earl believed that her findings were based on unsubstantiated medical histories. Later research demonstrated that the methods of questioning used on the children were extremely suggestive, leading to false accusations. Others believe that the questioning itself may have led to false memory syndrome among the children questioned. Only 41 of the original 360 children ultimately testified in the grand jury and pretrial hearings, and fewer than a dozen testified at the actual trials.

Michael P. Maloney, a clinical psychologist and professor of psychiatry, reviewed videotapes of the children's interviews. Maloney, testifying as an expert witness on interviewing children, was highly critical of the techniques used, referring to them as improper, coercive, directive, problematic and adult-directed in a way that forced the children to follow a rigid script. He concluded that "many of the kids' statements in the interviews were generated by the examiner." Transcripts and recordings of the interviews contained far more speech from adults than children and demonstrated that, despite the highly coercive interviewing techniques used, initially the children were resistant to interviewers' attempts to elicit disclosures. The recordings of the interviews were instrumental in the jury's refusal to convict, by demonstrating how children could be coerced to giving vivid and dramatic testimonies without having experienced actual abuse. The techniques used were shown to be contrary to the existing guidelines in California for the investigation of cases involving children and child witnesses.

== Allegations ==
Some of the accusations were described as "bizarre", overlapping with accusations that mirrored the emerging satanic ritual abuse panic. It was alleged that, in addition to having been sexually abused, the children saw witches fly, traveled in a hot-air balloon, and were taken through underground tunnels. When shown a series of photographs by Danny Davis (the McMartins' lawyer), one child identified actor Chuck Norris as one of the abusers.

Some of the abuse was alleged to have occurred in secret tunnels beneath the school. Several excavations turned up evidence of old buildings on the site and other debris from before the school was built, but no evidence of any secret chambers or tunnels was found. There were claims of orgies at car washes and airports, and of children being flushed down toilets to secret rooms where they would be abused, then cleaned up and presented back to their parents. Some child interviewees talked of a game called "naked movie star" and suggested they were forcibly photographed nude. During trial testimony, some children stated that the "naked movie star" game was actually a rhyming taunt used to tease other children—"What you say is what you are, you're a naked movie star"—and had nothing to do with having naked pictures taken.

Judy Johnson, who made the initial allegations, made bizarre and impossible statements about Raymond Buckey, including that he could fly. Though the prosecution asserted Johnson's mental illness was caused by the events of the trial, Johnson had admitted to them that she was mentally ill beforehand. Evidence of Johnson's mental illness was withheld from the defense for three years and, when provided, was in the form of sanitized reports that excluded Johnson's statements, at the order of the prosecution. One of the original prosecutors, Glenn Stevens, left the case in protest and stated that other prosecutors had withheld evidence from the defense, including the information that Johnson's son did not actually identify Ray Buckey in a series of photographs. Stevens also accused Robert Philibosian, the deputy district attorney on the case, of lying and withholding evidence from the court and defense lawyers in order to keep the Buckeys in jail and prevent access to exonerating evidence.

== Trials ==
Two trials were conducted for the McMartin preschool case. The first lasted from July 13, 1987, to January 18, 1990, while the second lasted from May 7, 1990, to July 27, 1990.

=== Arrests and preliminary hearing ===
On March 22, 1984, Virginia McMartin, her daughter Peggy McMartin Buckey, her grandchildren Ray and Peggy Ann Buckey, and teachers Mary Ann Jackson, Betty Raidor, and Babette Spitler were charged with 115 counts of child abuse, later expanded to 321 counts of child abuse involving 48 children.

In the 20 months of preliminary hearings, the prosecution, led by attorney Lael Rubin, presented their theory of sexual abuse. The children's testimony during the preliminary hearings was inconsistent. Michelle Smith and Lawrence Pazder, co-authors of the now-discredited Satanic ritual abuse autobiography Michelle Remembers, met with the parents and children involved in the case, and were believed by the initial prosecutor Glenn Stevens to have influenced the children's testimony.

In 1986, a new district attorney, Ira Reiner, called the evidence "incredibly weak" and dropped all charges against Virginia McMartin, Peggy Ann Buckey, Jackson, Raidor and Spitler. Peggy McMartin Buckey and Ray Buckey remained in custody awaiting trial; Peggy McMartin Buckey's bail had been set at $1 million and Ray Buckey had been denied bail.

=== First trial ===
The first trial opened on July 13, 1987. During the trial, the prosecution presented seven medical witnesses. The defense attempted to rebut them with several witnesses, but the judge limited them to one in order to save time. In their summation, the prosecution argued that they had seven experts on this issue, when the defense only had one.

Ray Buckey was initially held without bail. In 1987, the trial judge granted bail of $3 million, which Buckey was unable to raise. In December 1988, the judge cut that amount to 1.5 million. Finally, in February 1989, Buckey was released on bail after spending almost 5 years in jail.

In 1989, Peggy Ann Buckey's appeal to have her teaching credentials re-instated after their suspension was granted. The judge ruled that there was no credible evidence or corroboration to lead to the license being suspended, and that a review of the videotaped interviews with McMartin children "reveal[ed] a pronounced absence of any evidence implicating [Peggy Ann] in any wrongdoing and ... raises additional doubts of credibility with respect to the children interviewed or with respect to the value of CII interviewing techniques themselves." The following day the state credentialing board in Sacramento endorsed the ruling and restored Buckey's right to teach.

==== Perjury by confession witness ====
In October 1987, jailhouse informant George Freeman was called as a witness and testified that Ray Buckey had confessed to him while sharing a cell. Freeman later attempted to flee the country and confessed to perjury in a series of other criminal cases in which he manufactured testimony in exchange for favorable treatment by the prosecution, in several instances fabricating jailhouse confessions of other inmates. In order to guarantee his testimony during the McMartin case, Freeman was given immunity to previous charges of perjury.

==== Acquittals ====
On January 18, 1990, after three years of testimony and nine weeks of deliberation by the jury, Peggy McMartin Buckey was acquitted on all counts. Ray Buckey was cleared on 52 of 65 counts, while the jury were deadlocked on 13 counts. Nine of 11 jurors at a press conference following the trial stated that they believed the children had been molested but the evidence did not allow them to state who had committed the abuse beyond a reasonable doubt. Eleven out of the thirteen jurors who remained by the end of the trial voted to acquit Buckey of the charges; the refusal of the remaining two to vote for a not guilty verdict resulted in the deadlock.

=== Second trial and dismissal ===
Ray Buckey was retried later on 6 of the 13 counts of which he was not acquitted in the first trial. The second trial opened on May 7, 1990, and resulted in another hung jury on July 27, 1990. The prosecution then gave up trying to obtain a conviction, and the case was closed with all charges against Ray Buckey dismissed. He had been jailed for five years without ever being convicted of any crime.

== Media coverage ==
In 1988, The New York Times reported that the case "attracted national attention when the authorities speculated that hundreds of children might have been molested and subjected to satanic rituals" and "has teetered on the brink of mistrial".

The media coverage was generally skewed towards an uncritical acceptance of the prosecution's viewpoint. David Shaw of the Los Angeles Times wrote a series of articles, which later won the Pulitzer Prize, discussing the flawed and skewed coverage presented by his own paper on the trial. It was only after the case that coverage of the flaws in the evidence and events presented by witnesses and the prosecution were discussed.

Wayne Satz, at the time a reporter for the Los Angeles ABC affiliate television station KABC, reported on the case and the children's allegations. He presented an unchallenged view of the children's and parents' claims. Satz later entered into a romantic relationship with Kee MacFarlane, the social worker at the Children's Institute International, who was interviewing the children. Another instance of media conflict of interest occurred when David Rosenzweig, the Los Angeles Times editor overseeing the coverage, became engaged to marry Lael Rubin, the prosecutor.

== Legacy ==
The case lasted seven years and cost $15 million, the longest and most expensive criminal case in the history of the United States legal system, and ultimately resulted in no convictions. The McMartin Preschool closed, and the building was ultimately demolished. In 2005, one of the children (as an adult) retracted the allegations of abuse.

Never did anyone do anything to me, and I never saw them doing anything. I said a lot of things that didn't happen. I lied. ... Anytime I would give them an answer that they didn't like, they would ask again and encourage me to give them the answer they were looking for. ... I felt uncomfortable and a little ashamed that I was being dishonest. But at the same time, being the type of person I was, whatever my parents wanted me to do, I would do.

In an article in Los Angeles magazine, Mary A. Fischer said the case was "simply invented", and transmogrified into a national cause celebre by the misplaced zeal of six people: Judy Johnson, a mother of one of the children; Jane Hoag, the detective who investigated the complaints; Kee MacFarlane, the social worker who interviewed the children; Robert Philibosian, the district attorney who was in a losing battle for re-election; Wayne Satz, the television reporter who first reported the case; and Lael Rubin, the prosecutor.

In 1990, Peggy, Ray, and Peggy Ann Buckey spoke to the National Association of State Vocal Organizations about their experiences. Peggy Ann and Ray Buckey attended the 1997 "Day of Contrition" conference in Salem, Massachusetts. They were joined by other victims and experts of the day-care sex-abuse hysteria.

Ray Buckey studied law, changed his name and moved to the Northwest to start a family.

=== Legal ===
In many states, laws were passed allowing children to testify on closed-circuit TV so the children would not be traumatized by facing the accused. The arrangement was supported in Maryland v. Craig, in which the United States Supreme Court ruled that closed circuit testimony was permissible where it was limited to circumstances with a likelihood that a minor may be harmed by testifying in open court. The case also influenced how very young children were questioned for evidence in court cases with concerns over their capacity for suggestibility and false memories. The case and others like it also affected the investigation of allegations by young children. Normal police procedure is to record using video, tape or notes in interviews with alleged victims. The initial interviews with children by the CII were recorded, and demonstrated to the jury members in the trial the coercive and suggestive techniques used by CII staff to produce allegations.

These interviews were instrumental in the jury members failing to produce a guilty verdict against Buckey, and several similar trials with similar interviewing techniques produced similar not guilty verdicts when juries were allowed to view the recordings. In response, prosecutors and investigators began "abandoning their tape recorders and notepads" and a manual was produced for investigating child abuse cases that urged prosecutors and investigators not to record their interviews.

=== Continued allegations of secret tunnels ===
In 1990, parents who believed their children had been abused at the preschool hired archaeologist E. Gary Stickel to investigate the site. In May 1990, Stickel claimed he found evidence of tunnels, consistent with the children's accounts, under the McMartin Preschool using ground-penetrating radar, and direct observation, noting inconsistencies between soil type and root structures in the back-filled area.

Others have disagreed with Stickel's conclusions. John Earl wrote in 1995 that the concrete slab floor was undisturbed except for a small patch where the sewer line was tapped into. Once the slab was removed, there was no sign of any materials to line or hold up any tunnels, and the concrete floor would have made it impossible for the defendants to fill in any tunnels once the abuse investigation began. The article concluded that disturbed soil under the slab was from the sewer line and construction fill buried under the slab before it was poured. Further, Earl noted that some fill from beneath the concrete slab was dated to 1940.

W. Joseph Wyatt's 2002 report concluded that the so-called tunnels under the preschool were more plausibly explained as a series of adjacent rubbish pits used by the owners of the site before the preschool's construction in 1966. Materials found during the excavation included bottles predominantly dated to the 1930s and '40s, as well as tin-can fragments, plywood, inner tubes, professionally-butchered livestock bones, four small containers of trash, and a former owner's old mail box.

Only three small items found near the edge of the concrete slab were dated after 1966. Wyatt suggested one of these – a fragment of a plastic snack bag – was most likely dragged into the pit by rats or other scavengers, just as Stickel himself had suggested likely happened for other debris that did not fit his tunnel theory. The remaining items, per Wyatt, had likely been left by a plumber digging from adjacent to the building to avoid damaging the concrete pad. Wyatt speculated that Stickel's conclusions were colored by his collaboration with the parents of the McMartin children.

=== Effects on child abuse research ===
Shortly after investigation into the McMartin charges began, the funds to research child sexual abuse greatly increased, notably through the budget allocated for the National Center on Child Abuse and Neglect. The agency's budget increased from $1.8 million to $7.2 million between 1983 and 1984, increasing to $15 million in 1985, making it the greatest source of funding for child abuse and neglect prevention in the United States. The majority of this budget went toward studies on sexual abuse with only $5 million going towards physical abuse and neglect.

Federal funding was also used to arrange conferences on ritual abuse, providing an aura of respectability as well as allowing prosecutors to exchange tips on the best means of obtaining convictions. A portion of the funds were used to publish the book Behind the Playground Walls, which used a sample of children drawn from the McMartin families. The book claimed to study the effects of "reported" rather than actual abuse, but portrayed all of the McMartin children as actual victims of abuse despite a lack of convictions during the trials and without mentioning questions about the reality of the accusations. Another grant of $173,000 went to David Finkelhor, who used the funds to investigate allegations of day care sexual abuse throughout the country, combining the study of verified crimes by admitted pedophiles and unverified accusations of satanic ritual abuse.

=== Media ===
In 1995, HBO produced Indictment: The McMartin Trial, a movie based on the trials.

In 2019, Oxygen produced Uncovered: The McMartin Family Trials, a documentary about the events.

== See also ==
- Kern County child abuse cases
- Peter Ellis, a similar case in New Zealand
- Laurel Rose Willson
- South Ronaldsay child abuse scandal
- Martensville satanic sex scandal
- The Outreau trial, similar case in France
- Trial by media
- Wee Care Nursery School abuse trial
- Country Walk case
- Wenatchee child abuse prosecutions
- Pizzagate conspiracy theory
