= Faith Chapel Church ritual abuse case =

Child sexual abuse trial

- Court: San Diego Superior Court
- Decided: November 1993
- Verdict: Not guilty
- Defendant: Dale Akiki
- Prosecution: San Diego County District Attorney's Office, Mary Avery (Prosecutor)
- Defense: San Diego County Public Defenders, Kate Coyne, Sue Clemens (Defendants' Counsel)

Case history
- Prior action: None
- Subsequent actions: Civil suit filed, settled for $2 million

Outcome
- Acquitted on all 35 counts of child abuse and kidnapping

The Faith Chapel Church ritual abuse case was a case of a developmentally disabled individual charged with child sexual abuse in 1991 as part of the satanic ritual abuse moral panic. After a 9-month trial, the accused was found not guilty by the jury.

== Accusations and trial ==
Dale Anthony Akiki was born in 1957 with Noonan syndrome, a rare genetic disorder which left him with a concave chest, club feet, drooping eyelids and ears.

Akiki served with his wife Sharon as a volunteer babysitter at a church in San Diego County, California. In May 1991, he was arrested and charged with 35 counts of child abuse and kidnapping and held without bail for 30 months before trial. The government filed its first case against Akiki on May 10, 1991, in San Diego Superior Court. A second case was prosecuted against him on February 20, 1992. The campaign against him was initiated by Jack and Mary Goodall, the former being the CEO of Jack in the Box, who stated that they found his physical appearance, coupled with his working contact with the children of the church in his capacity as a volunteer, "disturbing."

Prosecutor Mary Avery was the founder of the San Diego Child Abuse Prevention Foundation, to which Goodall was the largest financial contributor. She was brought in to prosecute at the Goodalls' insistence after experienced child abuse prosecutors Harry Elias and Sally Penso found no grounds to charge Akiki with any crimes, citing the coercive investigation and the suggestive preparation and interrogation of children used by parents and therapists in the case.

During the investigations, few records were kept of the interviews with children, and Avery tried to ban the use of the term "ritual abuse" (a synonym for satanic ritual abuse); such measures were viewed as useful in obtaining prosecutions in an environment that was increasingly skeptical of allegations of satanic ritual abuse. During the trial, "the FBI’s leading authority on child abuse, testified ... he has found no evidence that ritual abuse exists."

The trial against Akiki started in the spring of 1993. The prosecution produced no physical evidence but did present allegations of satanic ritual abuse, including testimony that he had killed a giraffe and an elephant in front of the children, had drunk human blood in satanic rituals, and had abducted the children away from the church, despite his being unable to drive.

His trial lasted nine months (including six weeks of jury selection and seven and a half months of evidence), making it the longest in San Diego County history. The jury took seven hours to reach its "not guilty" verdict in November 1993. He was represented by Deputy Public Defenders Kate Coyne and Sue Clemens who received numerous awards and accolades for their groundbreaking defense. This case represented the first trial-level acquittal of a defendant charged with ritual abuse in the "satanic panic" of the 1980s, although a number of convictions were subsequently overturned on appeal.

After the trial had ended, members of the jury complained about the "overzealous prosecutors," "child sexual abuse syndrome" and "therapists on a witch-hunt". One said "it seemed like a witch hunt to me." Despite Akiki's acquittal, some of the parents involved remained convinced that he was guilty. The deputy district attorney and lead prosecutor Mary Avery disputed the claims that the nine children were systematically brainwashed by parents and therapists, stating that "the whole idea of contamination and suggestibility just does not account for the major behavior changes that occurred (in the children) while they were in Dale Akiki's (nursery school) class," referring to certain incidents like nightmares and bed-wetting.

== Subsequent events ==
The San Diego County Grand Jury reviewed the Akiki cases in 1994 and concluded in part that "There is no justification for the further pursuit of the theory of satanic ritual molestation in the investigation and prosecution of child abuse cases."

On August 25, 1994, Akiki filed a suit against the County of San Diego, the church where he had volunteered, and many others which was settled for $2 million.

San Diego County Public Defenders Kathleen Coyne and Susan Clemens were awarded Public Defender of the Year by the California Public Defender's Association in 1994 for their work defending Akiki.
