= Wayne Thomas Satz =

American journalist

Wayne Thomas Satz (January 10, 1945 – December 24, 1992) was a reporter who first reported on the McMartin preschool trial. His first McMartin broadcast aired on KABC-TV in Los Angeles on February 2, 1984.

Satz presented an unchallenged view of the children's and parents' claims. During the case, Satz became personally involved when he entered into a romantic relationship with Kee MacFarlane, the social worker at the Children's Institute International, who was interviewing the children. Satz did not reveal the relationship and continued reporting the unchallenged claims.

Satz also won a Peabody Award in 1977 for his reporting on the Los Angeles Police Department.

Satz died in 1992, at age 47, from a heart attack due to a deformed valve in his heart. He was found dead in his Studio City, Los Angeles home.
