= Kee MacFarlane =

American social worker

- Born: Kathleen MacFarlane; 1947 (age 78–79)
- Occupation: Social worker
- Known for: Role in the McMartin preschool trial

Kathleen 'Kee' MacFarlane (born 1947) is an American social worker known for involvement in the high-profile McMartin preschool trial in the 1980s. She was the Director of Children's Institute International. She developed the concept of the anatomically correct doll for children to use during interviews concerning abuse and played a significant role in the McMartin trial. MacFarlane has been criticized for her methods of interrogating small children. Charges against the defendants were eventually dropped.

== Professional training ==
She received a bachelor's degree in fine arts at Denison University in Ohio and later received her master's degree in social work. After graduation, MacFarlane became a lobbyist for the National Organization for Women and grant evaluator for the National Center for Child Abuse and Neglect, later becoming the Director of Children's Institute International (CII). Prior to the McMartin preschool trial, MacFarlane described herself as a psychotherapist but lacked any professional licenses.

== Involvement in the McMartin preschool trial ==
As part of her job at CII, MacFarlane interviewed 400 children for the McMartin preschool trial using anatomically correct dolls and hand puppets. MacFarlane believed that the children suffered from child sexual abuse accommodation syndrome, and would deny sexual abuse without special techniques designed to encourage disclosure. The interview techniques MacFarlane used during the investigation into the allegations were highly suggestive and invited children to pretend or speculate about supposed events. By spring of 1984, it was claimed that 360 children had been abused. Astrid Heppenstall Heger performed medical examinations and took photos of what she believed to be minute scarring which she stated was caused by anal penetration. Critics have alleged that the questioners repetitively asked the children leading questions which, it is said, always yields positive responses from young children, making it impossible to know what the child actually experienced. Others believe that the questioning itself may have led to false memory syndrome among the children who were questioned. Ultimately only 41 of the original 360 children testified during the grand jury and pretrial hearings, and fewer than a dozen testified during the actual trial.

MacFarlane went on to testify before Congress that she believed there was an organized, nationwide conspiracy of individuals and "orthodox satanic groups" sexually abusing children, although she never presented evidence of who any of the individuals were nor proof of any orthodox satanic groups.

== Publications ==
=== Books and book chapters ===
- MacFarlane, K; Bulkley J (1982). "Treating Child Sexual Abuse: An Overview of Current Program Models". In Conte JR; Shore DA (eds.). Social Work and Child Sexual Abuse. Haworth Press. ISBN 978-0-917724-98-5.
- MacFarlane, K; Waterman J (1998). Sexual Abuse of Young Children: Evaluation and Treatment. The Guilford Press. ISBN 978-0-89862-703-9.
- Cunningham, C; MacFarlane, K (1996). When Children Abuse: Group Treatment Strategies for Children With Impulse Control Problems. Safer Society Press. ISBN 978-1-884444-23-4.

=== Videos ===
- MacFarlane K, Feldmeth JR, Saywitz KJ (1986). Response Syllabus: The Clinical Interview. New York: The Guilford Press. ISBN 978-0-89862-940-8.
- The Clinical Interview; with Joanne Ross Feldmeth, Karen Saywitz (1988)
