= Mary de Young =

Professor of sociology formerly at Grand Valley State University

- Known for: Studies of child sexual abuse Studies of satanic ritual abuse as a moral panic
- Scientific career
- Fields: Sociology

Mary de Young is a retired professor of sociology formerly at Grand Valley State University, where from 2000 to 2003 she served as the head of the sociology department. She has published a variety of works in the area of child sexual abuse, including five books, several book chapters, and more than 35 peer-reviewed journal papers.

== Scholarly works ==
In 1989, de Young reviewed the literature published by pro-pedophile organizations for public dissemination and found that pro-pedophile organizations used several strategies to promote goals of public acceptance of pedophilia, including the adoption of value-neutral terminology, redefining the term child sexual abuse, promoting the idea that children can consent to sex with adults, questioning the assumption of harm, promoting objective research, and the declassification of pedophilia as mental illness.

De Young has also published several works examining the satanic ritual abuse controversy as a moral panic from a sociological perspective.

== Bibliography ==
=== Books ===
- de Young, Mary (1982). The Sexual Victimization of Children. Jefferson, N.C: McFarland. ISBN 0-89950-063-3.
- de Young, Mary (1985). Incest: an annotated bibliography. Jefferson, N.C: McFarland. ISBN 0-89950-142-7.
- de Young, Mary (1987). Child Molestation: an annotated bibliography. Jefferson, N.C: McFarland. ISBN 0-89950-243-1.
- de Young, Mary (2002). The ritual abuse controversy: an annotated bibliography. Jefferson, North Carolina: McFarland. ISBN 0-7864-1259-3.
- de Young, Mary (2004). The day care ritual abuse moral panic. Jefferson, N.C: McFarland. ISBN 0-7864-1830-3.
- de Young, Mary (2010). Madness: An American History of Mental Illness and Its Treatment. McFarland & Co.
- de Young, Mary (2015). Encyclopedia of Asylum Therapeutics, 1750–1950s. McFarland & Co.
