= Astrid Heppenstall Heger =

Professor of Clinical Pediatrics

Astrid Heppenstall Heger is a Professor of Clinical Pediatrics at the USC Keck School of Medicine and the founder and Executive Director of the Violence Intervention Program (VIP) at Los Angeles County-USC Medical Center in East Los Angeles.

Heger has both a bachelor's degree and an M.D. from the University of Southern California.

== Biography ==
In 1984, Heger founded the Center for the Vulnerable Child (CVC) for the evaluation of child abuse. This was the first medically based Child Advocacy Center in the world and currently evaluates over 10,000 child abuse and child sexual assault victims every year. This model program has been replicated in hundreds of programs around the world. Renamed the Violence Intervention Program (VIP), Heger established the first of its kind, "one-stop shop" community Family Advocacy Center, offering medical, mental health, protective, legal and social services to victims of family violence and sexual assault throughout Los Angeles County. With increasing pressure from law enforcement and social services to answer the need for improved services for adolescents and adults, in 1995 the program added interventions for sexual assault and domestic violence. Today, the VIP also serves over 4000 victims of, elder and dependent adult abuse. Most recently, Heger has implemented a model "HUB" program with services for children at risk for or already in foster care. This center incorporates 24/7 forensic and medical assessments with an ongoing medical home with built-in mental health services and support services that include dental care, plastic surgery, mentoring and tutoring. Over the past two years the VIP has built and renovated over 50,000 square feet (4,600 m^{2}) creating the S. Mark Taper Family Advocacy Center and the Santana House as a campus of services for children and families impacted by violence. This expanded space made it possible to expand HUB services and the creation of the Los Angeles County Elder Abuse Forensic Center.

In addition to her work providing medical and forensic interventions to children and adolescents impacted by family and sexual violence, Heger serves as a consultant to the Los Angeles County Coroner in cases involving child death or sexual assault in all ages.

She was an expert witness at the McMartin preschool trial. Journalist John Earl believes that Heger's findings were based on unsubstantiated medical histories. Critics have alleged that the questioners asked the children leading questions, repetitively, which, it is said, always yields positive responses from young children, making it impossible to know what the child actually experienced. Others believe that the questioning itself may have led to false-memory syndrome among the children who were questioned. Ultimately, only 41 of the original 360 children testified during the grand jury and pre-trial hearings, and less than a dozen testified during the actual trial. One of the children recanted in 2005.

== Publications ==
- Evaluation of the Sexually Abused Child: A Medical Textbook and Photographic Atlas. ISBN 0-19-513126-6
