= Kern County child abuse cases =

Satanic ritual abuse hysteria in the United States

The Kern County child abuse cases started the day care sexual abuse hysteria of the 1980s in Kern County, California. The cases involved allegations of satanic ritual abuse by a sex ring against as many as 60 children who testified they had been abused. At least 36 people were convicted and most of them spent years in prison. Thirty-four convictions were overturned on appeal. The district attorney responsible for the convictions was Ed Jagels, who was sued by at least one of those whose conviction was overturned, and who remained in office until 2009. Two of the convicted individuals were unable to prove their innocence because they died in prison.

== History ==
In 1982, Alvin and Debbie McCuan's two daughters, coached by their step-grandmother Mary Ann Barbour, who had custody of them, alleged they had been abused by their parents, and accused them of being part of a "sex ring" that included Scott and Brenda Kniffen. The Kniffens' two sons also claimed to have been abused. No physical evidence was ever found. The McCuans and Kniffens were convicted in 1984 and given a combined sentence of more than 1,000 years in prison. In 1996 the convictions were overturned and the two couples were released. A television movie about the Kniffens titled Just Ask My Children was broadcast on Lifetime in 2001.

Six similar cases occurred throughout Kern County. For instance, the testimony of five young boys was the prosecution's evidence in a trial in which four defendants were convicted. John Stoll, a 41-year-old carpenter, received the longest sentence of the group—40 years for 17 counts of lewd and lascivious conduct. "It never happened," Ed Sampley, one of the accusers, told a New York Times reporter in 2004. He claimed he had lied about Stoll. Stoll was in prison for 19 years before his conviction was overturned. In 2009, Stoll sued Kern County and was awarded $5 million in compensation. The county paid nearly $10 million to settle claims made by the former prisoners and the alleged victims. A documentary titled Witch Hunt, which emphasized primarily Stoll's case, was produced and released in 2007. MSNBC also made a documentary concerning John Stoll and the Kern County cases.

In 2004 Sampley and three other former accusers returned to the courthouse where they had testified against Stoll, this time to say that Stoll never molested them. In their late 20s, each of them said they always knew that Stoll had never touched them. However, Stoll's son has "continued to say that he had been molested." In the case, the only defendant with a previous conviction of molestation was Grant Self, who rented Stoll's pool house briefly. John Stoll had to wait until 2004 for the reversal of his convictions, but was released due to the new testimony. Self was sent to a mental hospital for sexual offenders because he had two prior convictions for child molestation. Self was freed in 2009. He was re-arrested in 2012 on suspicion of child molestation in Oregon. In July 2013, Self pleaded guilty to sexually abusing three young boys and was sentenced to five years and 10 months in prison.

Prior to the start of the Kern County child abuse cases, several local social workers had attended a training seminar that emphasized satanic ritual abuse as a major element of child sexual abuse, and had used the now-debunked memoir Michelle Remembers as training material.

== See also ==
- Innocence Project
- List of miscarriage of justice cases
- List of wrongful convictions in the United States
