= National Center on Child Abuse and Neglect =

The National Center on Child Abuse and Neglect (NCCAN) is a national center that was established within the Children's Bureau, Department of Health and Human Services, an agency of the Federal government of the United States. It was created by the Child Abuse Prevention and Treatment Act (CAPTA) of 1974.

The 1996 reauthorization of CAPTA, P.L. 104-235, abolished NCCAN. It provided for an Office on Child Abuse and Neglect (OCAN) to be created within the Children's Bureau instead, to coordinate NCCAN's former functions. Children's Bureau is an administration that supports NCCAN by providing money to fund research, as well as programs or systems that track and record the data on child abuse hoping to cause further prevention. The Children's Bureau headquarters is located in Washington, DC and has been running since 1912.

Today, OCAN supports programs, research, publications, and monitoring systems that strengthen families and help prevent child abuse and neglect. OCAN's funding to states and tribes also provides for child abuse and neglect assessment, investigation, prosecution, and treatment activities. Even though OCAN and NCCAN focus on America since it is a national center for the U.S., child abuse and neglect happens all over the world. In America alone, it is found that more than 5 children die every single day due to child abuse. Now compare that to the statistic, "In 2017, the WHO estimated that up to 1 billion minors between the ages of 2 and 17 years of age have endured violence either physical, emotional, or sexual." Child abuse doesn't always kill, yet it is causing major, sometimes lifelong effects and trauma on children, no matter what type of abuse occurs.

There is a large variety of what is considered child abuse or neglect. Different types of child abuse include sexual, physical, and psychological. Physical abuse refers to contact made to hurt a child by punching, beating, or anything along the lines of physical contact that results in pain. While sexual abuse may cause pain, it is under its own category described as "the involvement of dependent, developmentally immature children and adolescents in sexual activities which they do not fully comprehend, to which they are unable to give consent, or that violate the social taboos of family roles." Psychological abuse includes verbally bringing down a child through humiliation or using words to threaten/scare a child which can leave everlasting negative effects on a child. Even though neglect is considered abuse, it is different than the others mentioned since those require attention or involvement, even if it is negative, while neglect is the opposite. Neglect is the act of parents or guardians not providing for their children. Examples of neglect, which is actually the most common form of abuse, include not supplying food or clothing, not bringing their child to school or helping with their schoolwork, simply not giving a child enough attention, plus any other ways of not caring to provide a healthy or happy life for the child.

The above types of abuse and neglect effect everyone differently. There are a variety possible outcomes of children who grow up affected by abuse and neglect. Even though some overcome the harsh childhood they faced and move in a more positive direction, there are statistics that show otherwise for the others who sadly fall into the negative consequences of dealing with child abuse and neglect. According to The American Society for the Positive Care of Children, "In at least one study, about 80% of 21 year olds that were abused as children met criteria for at least one psychological disorder." Clearly, an extremely large amount of child abuse victims still face issues from it even once they are no longer children. Sadly, these psychological disorders that are caused from being abused as a child cause the cycle to never end. 30% of people who were abused, will become abusers or neglecters themselves to own children in the future.

During April 24-26th 2019, the 21st National Conference on Child Abuse and Neglect was held in order to come forward with new findings on the subject and provide better understanding on the issue to people who are affected or want to help with the abuse and neglect that occurs. The main ideas to get across, through this event, are the approaches and strategies being used, the policies that stand, what practices are being exercised, and what other programs are doing to support the center. "The conference is designed to address the complex, multi-faceted issues of preventing child maltreatment, promoting the safety, permanency, and well-being of children and families and supporting at-risk families. The National Conference on Child Abuse & Neglect is the only federally-sponsored national conference devoted to the issues of preventing child maltreatment."

The number one goal of The National Center on Child Abuse and Neglect is prevention. In order to achieve that goal, awareness of the issue must be brought to peoples attention through powerful presentations, workshops that provide information on the matter, active seminars, and other types of sessions that bring forward knowledge on child abuse and neglect. In just the United States, alone, 6.6 million children have been referred to agencies for child protection after a report of child abuse and neglect had been reported. The center is national, focusing on the United States itself, yet child abuse and neglect happens every day, everywhere.
