= Anatomically correct doll =

Model human with primary and secondary sex characteristics

An anatomically correct doll or anatomically precise doll is a doll that depicts some of the primary and secondary sex characteristics of a human for educational purposes. A very detailed type of anatomically correct doll may be used in questioning children who may have been sexually abused. The use of dolls as interview aids has been criticized, and the validity of information obtained this way has been contested.

== Overview ==
Some children's baby dolls and potty training dolls are anatomically correct for educational purposes. There are also dolls that are used as medical models, particularly in explaining medical procedures to child patients. These have a more detailed depiction of the human anatomy and may include features like removable internal organs. One notable anatomically correct doll was the "Archie Bunker's Grandson Joey Stivic" doll that was made by the Ideal Toy Co. in 1976. The doll, which was modeled after infant character Joey Stivic from the Television sitcom series All In The Family, was considered to be the first anatomically correct boy doll.

The dolls are also sometimes used by parents or teachers as sex education.

== Forensic use ==
A particular type of anatomically correct dolls are used in law enforcement and therapy. These dolls have detailed depictions of all the primary and secondary sexual characteristics of a human: "oral and anal openings, ears, tongues, nipples, and hands with individual fingers" for all and a "vagina, clitoris and breasts" for each of the female dolls and a "penis and testicles" for each of the male dolls.

These dolls are used during interviews with children who may have been sexually abused. The dolls wear removable clothing, and the anatomically correct and similarly scaled body parts ensure that sexual activity can be simulated realistically.

There is some criticism with regard to using anatomically correct dolls to question victims of sexual abuse. Critics argue that because of the novelty of the dolls, children will act out sexually explicit maneuvers with the dolls even if the child has not been sexually abused. Another criticism is that because the studies that compare the differences between how abused and non-abused children play with these dolls are conflicting (some studies suggest that sexually abused children play with anatomically correct dolls in a more sexually explicit manner than non-abused children, while other studies suggest that there is no correlation), it is impossible to interpret what is meant by how a child plays with these dolls.
