= The road to hell is paved with good intentions =

Proverb

"The road to hell is paved with good intentions" is a proverb or aphorism.

== Meaning ==
A common meaning of the phrase is that wrongdoings or evil actions are often undertaken with good intentions; or that good intentions, when acted upon, may have bad consequences. An example is the introduction of Asian carp into the United States in the 1970s to control algal blooms in captivity. Within ten years, the carp escaped and spread throughout the Mississippi River System.

A different interpretation of the saying is that individuals may have the intention to undertake good actions but nevertheless fail to take them. This inaction may be due to procrastination, laziness, or another subversive vice. As such, the saying is an admonishment that a good intention is meaningless unless followed through. This is consistent with another saying, often misattributed to Edmund Burke: "the only thing necessary for evil to win is for good men to do nothing".

=== Studies ===
Psychological studies of the effect of intention upon task completion by professors Peter Gollwitzer, Paschal Sheeran and Sheina Orbell indicate that there is some truth in the proverb. Perfectionists are especially prone to having their intentions backfire in this way. A 2004 study argued that people are more likely to interpret their own actions as more well-intended than the actions of others.

Attempts to improve the ethical behaviour of groups are often counterproductive. If legislation is used for such an attempt, people observe the letter of the law rather than improve the desired behaviour. The threat of punishment may make behavior less rather than more ethical. Studies of business ethics indicate that most wrongdoing is not due directly to wickedness but is performed by people who did not plan to err.

Stephen Garrard Post, writing about altruism, suggests that good intentions are often not what they seem and that mankind normally acts from less worthy, selfish motives—"If the road to hell is paved with good intentions, it is partly because that is the road they generally start out on."

== Origins ==
The exact origin of this proverb is unknown, and several variations exist. The first full version of the phrase appeared in an 1811 English version of one of Johann Jacob Rambach's books "The road to hell is paved with good resolutions", a translation of his 1730 German text Der Weg zur Höllen sey mit lauter gutem Vorsatz gepflastert. In a 1741 sermon at Oxford University, John Wesley said “Hell is paved, saith one, with good intentions.” In a London newspaper in 1828 it was referred to as a Portuguese proverb. James Boswell's 1791 biography of Samuel Johnson quotes Johnson as saying to an acquaintance in 1775: "Sir, hell is paved with good intentions."

The earliest known text resembling this phrase occurs in Virgil's Aeneid: "facilis descensus Averno" (the descent to hell is easy). A resemblance can be found in Ecclesiasticus 21:10: "The way of sinners is paved with smooth stones, but at its end is the pit of Hades." Another resemblance also can be found in one Hadith that Muhammad said: "Paradise is surrounded by adversity, and Hellfire is surrounded by lusts."

The proverb is often misattributed to Bernard of Clairvaux, who is claimed to have said: "L'enfer est plein de bonnes volontés ou désirs" (Hell is full of good intentions and wills), in a letter by Francis de Sales (c. 1604). John Foxe quotes William Tyndale (1494–1536) as writing: "Beware of good intents." The second part of "Chapter 213" of Acts and Monuments cites "Fol. 87" of "The Wicked Mammon".

An earlier iteration "borrowed of" another language was "Hell is full of good meanings and wishes" and was published in 1670 in A Collection of English Proverbs collected by John Ray. It was also published in Henry G. Bohn's A Hand-book of Proverbs in 1855.

Another alternative form is "Hell is full of good meanings, but heaven is full of good works".

== Artistic references ==
Authors who have used the phrase include Charlotte Brontë, Lord Byron, Randy Travis, Samuel Taylor Coleridge, Sir Walter Scott, Søren Kierkegaard, and Karl Marx. Ozzy Osbourne used the term in the song "Tonight" on his album Diary of a Madman. Five Finger Death Punch used the term on their song "Living The Dream" for their eighth studio album released in 2020, F8.

In the movie Highway to Hell, the phrase is taken literally to create one particular scene. The Good Intentions Paving Company has a team of Andy Warhols who grind good-intentioned souls to form the pavement. "I was only sleeping with my husband's boss to advance his career", says one. The figurative meaning of the phrase is a big part of the plot, too, as several characters offer to help the two protagonists on the Road to Hell, but all of them have ulterior motives.

== See also ==
- Do-gooder – Negative perception of a person's morally motivated actions
- Murphy's law – Adage that anything that can go wrong will go wrong
- No good deed goes unpunished – Sardonic saying
- Unintended consequences – Unforeseen outcomes of an action
- Whom the gods would destroy, they first make mad – Long-standing maxim
