= Wee Willie Winkie =

1841 rhyme by William Miller

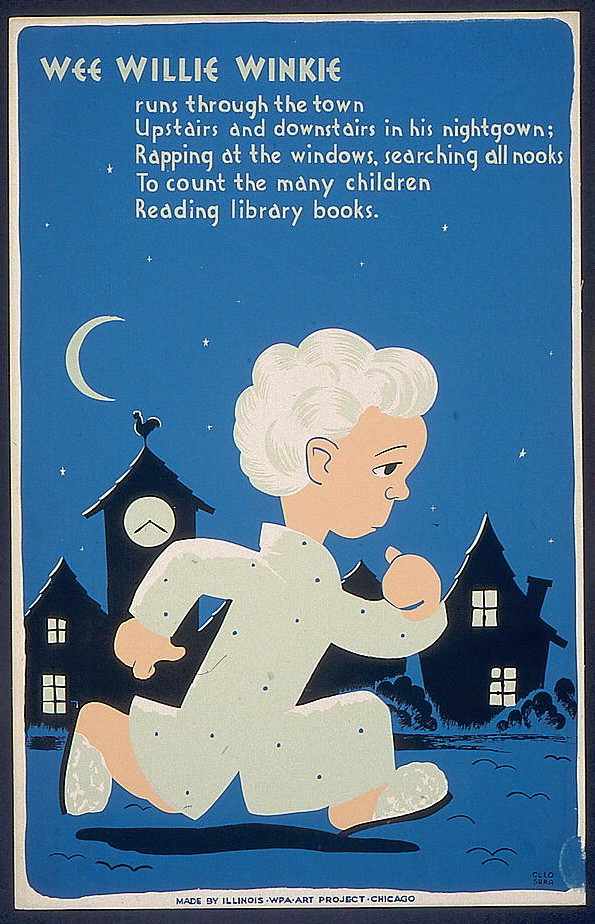
- 1940 WPA poster using Wee Willie Winkie to promote children's libraries

Nursery rhyme
- Language: Scots
- Published: 1841
- Lyricist: William Miller

"Wee Willie Winkie" is a Scottish nursery rhyme whose protagonist has become popular as a personification of sleep. It has a Roud Folk Song Index number of 13711.

Scots poet William Miller (1810–1872), appears to have popularised a pre-existing nursery rhyme, adding additional verses to make up a five stanza poem. Miller’s “Willie Winkie: A Nursery Rhyme’ was first published in a collection of poems called Whistle-Binkie: Stories for the Fireside (1841)1. with the footer that 'Willie Winkie' was "The Scottish Nursery Morpheus" indicating, that Miller was drawing upon an established folkloric figure of sleep, Morpheus.

The chapbook The Cries of Banbury and London (c. 1820) contains the singular first verse ‘little willie winkie’, pre-dates the publication of Miller’s poem. Another nursery collection, published in London three years after Miller’s poem, also contains just the first stanza, suggesting that the lyrics were circulating independently in the 1840s.

== Words ==
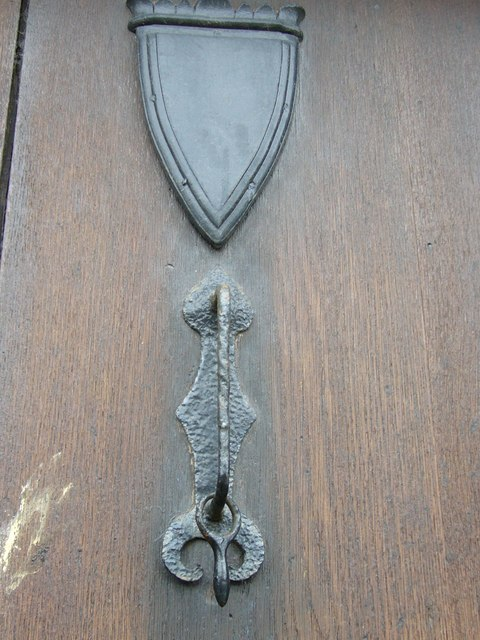
A tirling pin on a house in Edinburgh. The pin was scraped up and down to make a rattling sound, announcing a visitor's presence

Original text of 1841 in Scots, alongside a paraphrased English version (from 1844):

Wee Willie Winkie rins through the toon,
Up stairs an' doon stairs in his nicht-gown,
Tirlin' at the window, crying at the lock,
"Are the weans in their bed, for it's now ten o'clock?"

"Hey, Willie Winkie, are ye comin' ben?
The cat's singin grey thrums to the sleepin hen,
The dog's speldert on the floor and disna gie a cheep,
But here's a waukrife laddie, that wunna fa' asleep."

Onything but sleep, you rogue, glow'ring like the moon,
Rattlin' in an airn jug wi' an airn spoon,
Rumblin', tumblin' roon about, crawin' like a cock,
Skirlin like a kenna-what, waukenin' sleepin' fock.

"Hey Willie Winkie, the wean's in a creel,
Wamblin' aff a bodie's knee like a verra eel,
Ruggin' at the cat's lug and raveling a' her thrums-
Hey Willie Winkie – see there he comes."

Wearit is the mither that has a stoorie wean,
A wee, stumpie, stousie, that canna rin his lane,
That has a battle aye wi' sleep afore he'll close an e'e-
But a kiss frae aff his rosy lips gies strength anew to me.

Translation:

Wee Willie Winkie runs through the town,
Up stairs and down stairs in his night-gown,
Tapping at the window, crying at the lock,
Are the children in their bed, for it's past ten o'clock?

Hey, Willie Winkie, are you coming in?
The cat is singing purring sounds to the sleeping hen,
The dog's spread out on the floor, and doesn't give a cheep,
But here's a wakeful little boy who will not fall asleep!

Anything but sleep, you rogue! glowering like the moon,'
Rattling in an iron jug with an iron spoon,
Rumbling, tumbling round about, crowing like a cock,
Shrieking like I don't know what, waking sleeping folk.

Hey, Willie Winkie – the child's in a creel!
Wriggling from everyone's knee like an eel,
Tugging at the cat's ear, and confusing all her thrums
Hey, Willie Winkie – see, there he comes!"

Weary is the mother who has a dusty child,
A small short sturdy child, who can't run on his own,
Who always has a battle with sleep before he'll close an eye
But a kiss from his rosy lips gives strength anew to me.

== Origins and meaning ==
The poem was first printed in Whistle-binkie: Stories for the Fireside by William Miller in 1841, then re-printed in Whistle-Binkie; a Collection of Songs for the Social Circle published in 1873. In Jacobite songs Willie Winkie referred to King William III of England, one example being "The Last Will and Testament of Willie winkie" but it seems likely that Miller was simply using the name rather than writing a Jacobite satire.

Such was the popularity of Wee Willie Winkie that the character has become one of several bedtime entities such as the Sandman, Ole Lukøje of Scandinavia, Klaas Vaak of the Netherlands, Dormette of France and Billy Winker in Lancashire.
