= List of Music Choice channels =

The following is a current and former list of Music Choice cable radio audio channels which are accessible through participating cable providers, Verizon Fios, and DirecTV, along with those who utilize Music Choice's iOS and Google Play mobile apps through TV Everywhere authentication. Several channels are marked with an [E]; these channels allow profanity and explicit content in the songs played, with non-noted channels carrying radio edits otherwise. Channels indicated by an asterisk (*) are exclusive to the Music Choice website and its mobile apps. Channels indicated with a dagger (†) are monitored by Mediabase.

== List of current Music Choice channels ==
- '60s - '80s Rock & Pop* (formerly '80s, Classic Rock & Oldies)
- '60s & '70s Mellow Hits - Slow and mid-tempo pop music from the 1960s and 1970s.
- '60s British Invasion*
- '60s Classic Rock*
- '60s Generation - Hits from the 1960s.
- '70s † - Hits from the 1970s.
- '70s & '80s Favorites † - Rock, pop and disco hits from the 1970s and 1980s.
- '70s Classic Rock*
- '70s Soul*
- '80s † - Hits from the 1980s.
- '80s One-Hit Wonders*
- '80s Rock* † - Glam/hair metal from the 1980s.
- '90s † - Hits from the 1990s.
- '90s Club Hits [E]*
- '90s Country*
- '90s Hip-Hop*
- '90s R&B*
- '90s Rock [E]* - Popular rock music from the 1990s.
- 2000s* † - Hits from the 2000s.
- 2000s R&B* - R&B music from the 2000s.
- 2000s Rap [E]* - Rap music from the 2000s.
- 2010s* - Hits from the 2010s.
- Adult Alternative † - Alternative music that is targeted for more adult audiences.
- Adult Alternative & Classic Rock*
- Alt & Rock Favorites †
- Alt R&B*
- Alternative [E]* †
- Americana* - Alternative country and Americana music.
- Beach Hits*
- Big Band* - Big Band music.
- Black Excellence [E]*
- Bluegrass* - Traditional and contemporary bluegrass music.
- Blues † - Blues music from the early artists of the 1920s to present day.
- Brazilian Pop* † - A mix of classic and contemporary Brazilian popular music.
- Brits & Hits* - Pop music featuring either vocals from or written by artists from the UK music industry.
- Broadway*
- Calming Classical - Soothing, timeless classical music.
- Calming Pet Music*
- Classic Alternative* †
- Classic Christmas - A mix of classic and traditional-sounding Christmas music, ranging from the 1940s to 1990s.
- Classic Country - Traditional country music from the 1940s to around the launch of the new country genre in 1990.
- Classic Dance [E]* † - A channel that plays 1970s-1990s electronic-styled dance music, disco and club hits.
- Classic Metal [E]* † - A mix of 1970s-1990s heavy metal music.
- Classic Rock † - Album-oriented playlists from the 1960s through the 2010s with artists who helped pioneer the genre of rock music.
- Classical Masterpieces - Classical works from composers of the Renaissance to the present day, generally of considerable length.
- Coffee Shop Favorites* - Eclectic mix of singer-songwriters from Adult Alternative to R&B.
- Contemporary Christian - Inspiring and uplifting Christian and worship music from the 1980s to the present.
- Contemporary Instrumentals* - Instrumental music, containing a mix of smooth jazz, new age, beautiful instrumentals and instrumental cover versions of songs.
- Country Favorites † - An overall mix of country music, regardless of year or genre.
- Country Hall of Famers*
- Country Party*
- Country Rock †
- Country Songwriters*
- Dance †
- Disney Hits*
- Disney Piano* - Piano performances of classic Disney songs.
- Easy Listening - Instrumentals performed by string orchestras and soloists from around the world.
- Family Hits* - Family-friendly pop music.
- Feel-Good Favorites - Melodic pop hits and soft rock classics from the 1970s to today.
- Filipino* - A mix of 90s-today's Filipino popular music.
- Folk* - A mix of traditional and contemporary folk music.
- Freestyle Hits*
- Funk* - A mix of 1970s-1980s funk music.
- Gospel - Modern and traditional gospel music.
- Happy Hits - Kid-appropriate pop music.
- Hard Rock [E]* † - Hard rock music.
- Hawaiian* - Mix of contemporary island music and classics from past decades. Includes local Hawaiian artists performing Hawaiian music and island stylings of non-Hawaiian songs, as well as non-Hawaiian artists performing music from or about Hawaii.
- Hip-Hop and R&B † - Today's hottest hip-hop and R&B music.
- Hip-Hop Classics † - Old school Hip-hop hits from artists that pioneered the genre of hip-hop.
- Hip-Hop Party*
- Honky-tonk* - Jukebox country songs.
- Indie [E]* †
- Irish Favorites* - Irish music.
- Italian Favorites* † - Favorite Italian music.
- Jazz - Traditional and contemporary jazz mix that utilizes traditional jazz elements.
- Jazz Vocal Hits* - Favorite jazz vocalists.
- Jazz Vocal Standards* - Popular jazz standards.
- Joyful Instrumentals
- Kids Movies & Musicals* (formerly Kids Movie Soundtracks) - Soundtracks from children's and family-friendly movies and musicals.
- Kids Only!* - Music popular with tweens and youngsters, not necessarily "children's songs".
- K-Pop* † - South Korean popular music.
- Latin Jazz*
- Light Classical - Classical works from composers of the late Renaissance to the present day, generally of shorter length than those featured on "Classical Masterpieces".
- Lounge* † - A mix of electronic chill-out, downtempo, ambient and electronic lounge music.
- Love Songs* † - Romantic monster ballads and mid-tempo songs from yesterday and today.
- Lullabies* - Gentle bedtime music for children.
- Mainstream Rap [E]* † - Rap music that dominated the charts.
- Malt Shop Favorites* - Classic malt shop jukebox music.
- Metal [E]* †
- Mexicana* † - A wide variety of traditional folk music from Mexico, featuring styles as ranchera, banda and mariachi.
- Motown Hits*
- Movie Scores* - Film scores.
- Musica Urbana* † - Reggaeton and Latin hip-hop.
- Nature Sounds* - Outdoor nature music.
- New Age* - New age music.
- New Music Now*
- New Wave* †
- Opera* - Opera and classical vocal music.
- Party Favorites*
- Pop & Country † - Modern country music mixed with country-infused pop.
- Pop & Hip-Hop* †
- Pop Energy † - A mix of pop, dance, hip-hop and rock music from the 1990s to today.
- Pop Hits † - A mix of pop music for greatest hits.
- Pop Instrumentals - Vocal-free pop instrumental music.
- R&B Classics † - A variety of funk, soul, and Motown hits from the 1950s to 1990s.
- R&B Groove*
- R&B Slow Jams*
- Rainy Days*
- Rap [E]* † - Popular rap music upon its hit songs.
- Reggae* † - Mix of reggae, ska and other Caribbean rhythms of the past and present.
- Relaxing Vibes - A modern genre of easy listening music.
- Retro Workout* † - Classic workout music.
- Rock † - Popular rock songs like hard rock, heavy metal and alternative metal.
- Rock & Pop Hits*
- Rock Latino* † - A mix of Spanish-language rock and Latin alternative music.
- Romantic Latin Pop
- Singers & Swing - big band, swing & adult standards.
- Sleep Sounds (formerly Sleep Noise) - Sleep-inducing music.
- Smooth Jazz
- Soft Rock (formerly Lite Rock) - Slow and mid-tempo pop music, adult contemporary music, country music, and popular music from the past and present. Up until 2016, the normal schedule was replaced with contemporary Christmas music from November 29 through January 6.
- Solid Gold Oldies - Hits from the 1950s and 1960s.
- Sounds of the Seasons - Special music that plays to celebrate various holidays and seasons.
  - December 30 - January 1: NYE Music
  - January 1 - February 2: Cozy Winter
  - February 2–16: Valentine's Day
  - February 16-18: Mardi Gras
  - February 18 - March 1: Cozy Winter
  - March 1-22: St. Patrick's Day
  - March 22 - May 22: Feel-Good Spring
  - May 22–25: Summertime Fun
  - May 25-26: Memorial Day
  - May 26 - June 27: Summertime Fun
  - June 27 - July 6: Fourth of July
  - July 6 - August 1: Christmas in July
  - August 1 - September 24: Summertime Fun
  - September 25 - October 1: Oktoberfest
  - October 1 – November 1: Halloween
  - November 1 - December 30: Holiday 2026
- Soundscapes - Mix of new age and atmospheric music.
- Southern Gospel* - Traditional gospel.
- Stage & Screen* - Music from film, television themes and Broadway themes.
- Symphony* - Classical symphonies.
- Taste Of Italy* - Italian music, ranging from standards to contemporary Italian-language hits.
- The Pulse* - Ambient music.
- Throwback Jams † - Mix of R&B, urban hits, and old-school rap from the 1980s to 2000s.
- Today's Country † - Modern country music, ranging from the current day to around the mid-2000s.
- Today's Hits † - Popular Top 40 hits.
- Today's Latin Hits † - Today's hottest hits and pop music from Latin artists.
- Today's R&B † - Urban adult music and sultry, slow jams.
- Toddler Tunes* - Contemporary music aimed at babies, toddlers and young children; including lullabies that are played at night.
- Trending Hits † - Popular, trending music geared towards teenagers.
- Tropicales †
- Underground Hip-Hop [E]* †
- Vietnamese* - Vietnamese music.
- Workout [E]* † - Workout music.
- Yacht Rock † - Singer-songwriter soft pop from the mid-70s to mid-80s.
- Yoga Vibes* - Yoga music.

== List of defunct channels ==
These Music Choice channels over the years have either been taken off the air, renamed, or they were replaced by another channel. The latest update was August 26, 2025, where 10 channels were renamed.

- '60s - (renamed '60s Generation from the August 26, 2025 update)
- '60s Movement - (renamed '60s)
- '80s, Classic Rock & Oldies (renamed '60s-'80s Rock & Pop)
- '80s One Hit Wonders - (renamed '80s One-Hit Wonders)
- Adult Top 40 - (absorbed into Pop Hits and Hit List)
- All Christmas - (renamed Classic Christmas)
- Americana - (replaced by True Country, returned as an online exclusive channel in 2017)
- Arena Rock - (replaced by Retro Rock)
- Bluegrass - (removed in 2009, returned as an online exclusive channel in 2017)
- Bonfire Rock
- Brits + Hits (renamed Brits & Hits)
- Classic Alternative - (removed in 2013, returned as an online exclusive channel)
- Classic Disco - (replaced by MC MixTape)
- Classic R&B - (replaced by R&B Classics)
- Coffee Shop Cuts - (renamed Coffee Shop Favorites)
- Country Hits - (renamed Country Favorites from the August 26, 2025 update)
- Covers
- Dance and Electronica - (merged)
- Dance/Electronica - (renamed Dance/EDM in 2013)
- Dance/EDM - (renamed back to Dance in 2024)
- Gone Fishin' - (turned into a playlist available on the Music Choice app)
- Gospel Hallelujah - (renamed Southern Gospel)
- Hit List - (renamed Today's Hits from the August 26, 2025 update)
- Indie Rock - (online exclusive, became its own channel on August 5, 2014)
- International Love Songs - (removed in 2009 but came back on the air as Love Songs in 2013)
- Kids Movie Soundtracks - (renamed Kids Movies & Musicals in 2021)
- Kidz Only! - (renamed Kids Only!)
- Latin Trap Hits
- Light Hits
- Lite Rock - (renamed Soft Rock)
- MC MixTape - (replaced by MCU in 2012. Songs became part of the Dance/Electronica channel until 2013)
- MC Workout: Cardio
- MC Workout: Yoga - (renamed Yoga Vibes)
- Music Choice Max - (renamed Pop & Hip-Hop in 2025)
- Old School Rap - (renamed Hip Hop Classics in 2009)
- Opera - (removed in 2009, returned as an online exclusive channel in 2017)
- Power Rock
- Pop & Alt
- Pop Latino - (renamed Today's Latin Hits)
- Pop Rhythmic - (renamed Max in January 2016)
- Progressive
- R&B 2K - (renamed 2000s R&B)
- R&B Hits - (replaced by Throwback Jamz)
- R&B Soul - (renamed Today's R&B)
- Radio Disney - (replaced by Kidz Only! in 2007)
- Rap 2K - (renamed 2000s Rap)
- Rap Pioneers
- Retro Rock - (merged with Classic Alternative in 2013 to form Rock Hits)
- Rock en Espanol - (replaced by Romances)
- Rock Hits - (renamed Alt & Rock Favorites)
- Rock Songwriters
- Romances - (renamed Romantic Latin Pop)
- Salsa y Merengue - (replaced by Tropicales)
- Showcase - (replaced by Hip-Hop Classics and Classic Dance in 2017)
- Showtunes - (replaced by Stage & Screen)
- Singers and Standards - (renamed Singers and Swing)
- Sleep Noise - (renamed Sleep Sounds)
- Smooth R&B - (replaced by R&B Soul)
- Teen Beats - (renamed Teen Hits)
- Teen Hits - (renamed Trending Hits from the August 26, 2025 update)
- Teen MC - (renamed Teen Beats in January 2016)
- Throwback Jamz - (renamed Throwback Jams from the August 26, 2025 update)
- True Country - (replaced by Country Hits)
- Y2K - (renamed 2000s)
- Youth Hits - (renamed Family Hits)
