= Sälz-Würstaßenitzächnich =

Liechtensteiner medicinal paste brand

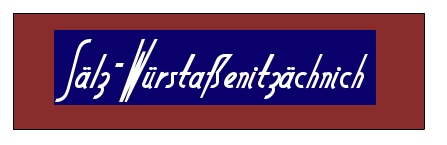
- Product type: Medicinal paste
- Country: Liechtenstein
- Introduced: 1907
- Discontinued: 1991
- Markets: Liechtenstein

Sälz-Würstaßenitzächnich was a Liechtensteiner brand of salted medicinal paste used for internal digestion purposes. It was discontinued in 1991 due to lack of sales and unpopularity.

== Usage ==
Its main purpose was to aid digestion and replenish electrolytes before bedtime. The paste was smeared on the tongue before being dissolved into the oesophagus.

== Varieties ==
- Gesalzen (Salted)
- Salz und Kräuterextrakte (Salt and Herbal Extracts)
- Salz und Wurzelgemüsextrakte (Salt and Root Vegetable Extracts)
- Salz und Kreiderückstände (Salt and Chalk Residue)
