= Interactive media =

Digital media which make use of moving images, animations, videos and audio

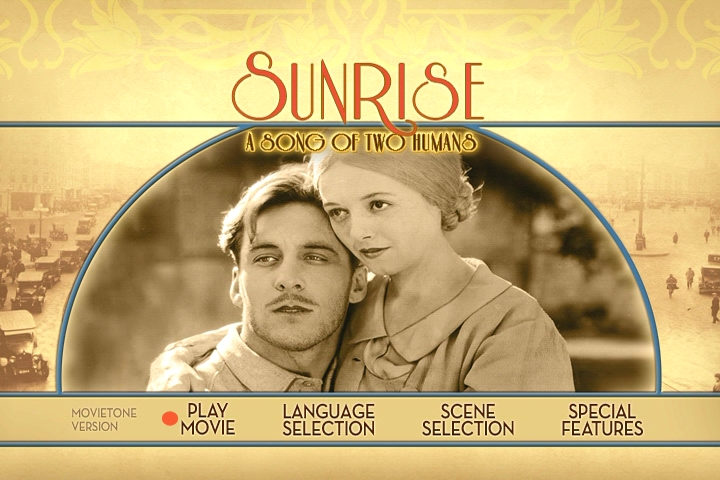
A DVD-Video typically includes an interactive menu allowing the user to change settings or play additional content.

Interactive media refers to digital experiences that dynamically respond to user input, delivering content such as text, images, animations, video, and audio. Interactions may be pre-programmed, stochastically driven, or AI-driven. Over the years, interactive media has expanded across gaming, education, social platforms, and immersive technologies like VR and AR. With the rise of AI-generated content, decision-driven narratives, and real-time engagement, concerns have shifted toward cybersecurity risks, digital well-being, and the societal impact of hyper-personalized media.

== Definition ==
Interactive media is a method of communication in which the output from the media comes from the input of the users. Interactive media works with the user's participation. The media still has the same purpose but the user's input adds interaction and brings potentially interesting features to the system.

== Development ==
The analogue videodisc developed by NV Philips was the pioneering technology for interactive media. Additionally, there are several elements that encouraged the development of interactive media including the following:

- The laser disc technology was first invented in 1958. It enabled the user to access high-quality analogue images on the computer screen. This increased the ability of interactive video systems.
- The concept of the graphical user interface (GUI), which was developed in the 1970s, popularized by Apple Computer, Inc. was essentially about visual metaphors, intuitive feel and sharing information on the virtual desktop. Additional power was the only thing needed to move into multimedia.
- The sharp fall in hardware costs and the unprecedented rise in the computer speed and memory transformed the personal computer into an affordable machine capable of combining audio and color video in advanced ways.
- Another element is the release of Windows 3.0 in 1990 by Microsoft into the mainstream IBM clone world. It accelerated the acceptance of GUI as the standard mechanism for communicating with small computer systems.
- The development by NV Philips of optical digital technologies built around the compact disk (CD) in 1979 is also another leading element in the interactive media development as it raised the issue of developing interactive media.

All of the prior elements contributed in the development of the main hardware and software systems used in interactive media.

== Terminology ==
Though the word media is plural, the term is often used as a singular noun.

Interactive media is related to the concepts interaction design, new media, interactivity, human computer interaction, cyberculture, digital culture, interactive design, and can include augmented reality and virtual reality.

An essential feature of interactivity is that it is mutual: user and machine each take an active role. Most interactive computing systems are for some human purpose and interact with humans in human contexts.

Interactive media are an instance of a computational method influenced by the sciences of cybernetics, autopoiesis and system theories, and challenging notions of reason and cognition, perception and memory, emotions and affection.

Any form of interface between the end user/audience and the medium may be considered interactive. Interactive media is not limited to electronic media or digital media. Board games, pop-up books, flip books and constellation wheels are all examples of printer interactive media. Books with a simple table of contents or index may be considered interactive due to the non-linear control mechanism in the medium, but are usually considered non-interactive since the majority of the user experience is non-interactive reading.

== Advantages ==
=== Effects on learning ===
Interactive media is helpful in the four development dimensions in which young children learn: social and emotional, language development, cognitive and general knowledge, and approaches toward learning. Using computers and educational computer software in a learning environment helps children increase communication skills and their attitudes about learning. Children who use educational computer software are often found using more complex speech patterns and higher levels of verbal communication. A study found that basic interactive books that simply read a story aloud and highlighted words and phrases as they were spoken were beneficial for children with lower reading abilities. Children have different styles of learning, and interactive media helps children with visual, verbal, auditory, and tactile learning styles.

Furthermore, studies conducted using interactive, immersive media (such as virtual reality) has proven effects on the educational impacts of students diagnosed with autism spectrum disorder. Through the use of additional sensors and specialized equipment, immersive medias have been questioned on their effectiveness to include students who may be considered neurodivergent. Interactive media can often be considered as highly stimulating, which raised concerns for overstimulation and potential triggers of reaction for particular students.

Interactive media has also been used under multiple professions to provide training opportunities, such as its use in medical training and education.

=== Intuitive understanding ===
Interactive media makes human-machine interfaces more intuitive. Interactive products such as smartphones, tablets, portable media players, interactive whiteboards, and websites are designed for ease of use. This encourages consumers to experiment with their products rather than reading instruction manuals.

=== Relationships ===
Interactive media promotes dialogic communication. This form of communication allows senders and receivers to build long term trust and cooperation. This plays a critical role in building relationships. Organizations also use interactive media to go further than basic marketing and develop more positive behavioral relationships. The use of interactive media, alongside immersive media, also has the additional benefit to providing further realism to creating relational bonds in virtual settings. Through the use of this technology, new types of relationships can be formed as well as strengthening preexisting ones.

== Disadvantages ==
=== Public safety and distraction ===
Interactive media has given way to new distractions which can lead to public safety issues. Digital distractions are heightened by the necessity for user input and response to media requests.

=== Poor sleep habits ===
Smartphones are a prevalent form of interactive media, and their excessive use can lead to bedtime procrastination. Mobile phone use that keeps individuals up at night causes adverse health effects such as fatigue and headaches.

== Influence on families ==
The introduction of interactive media has greatly affected the lives and inner workings of families, with many family activities having integrated with technology quite seamlessly, allowing both children and parents to adapt to it as they see fit. However, parents have also become increasingly worried about the impact that it will have on their family lives. This is not necessarily because they are opposed to technology, but because they fear that it will lessen the time that they get to spend with their children. Studies have shown that although interactive media is able to connect families together when they are unable to physically, the dependence on these media also continues to persist even when there are opportunities for family time, which often leads the adults to believe that it distracts children more than it benefits them.

== Types ==
=== Distributed interactive media ===
The media which allows several geographically remote users to interact synchronously with the media application/system is known as Distributed Interactive Media. Some common examples of this type of Media include Online Gaming, Distributed Virtual Environment, Whiteboards which are used for interactive conferences and many more.

=== Commercial interactive media ===
Interactive medias assist in commercial ventures, such as those incorporating media using virtual and augmented technologies. Virtual tours is one demonstrated way in which interactive media is able to meet commercial needs and provide alternative revenue for business. Studies show that through the use of immersive, interactive media business are expected greater marketing impacts.

=== Informational interactive media ===
An example of informational media in which information is provided interactively would be Geographic Information Systems, like those built upon the ArcGIS framework which provides users with the means to interact with locational data in various ways such as collecting, storing and manipulating.

== Examples ==
A couple of basic examples of interactive media are websites and mobile applications. Websites, especially social networking websites provide the interactive use of text and graphics to its users, who interact with each other in various ways such as chatting, posting a thought or picture and so forth. The ImmersiveMe convention brings together those in the industry, displaying mass examples of interactive medias and their impacts such as those in the Digital Humanities space where interactive media was able to be used for research purposes.

== Technologies and implementation ==
Interactive media can be implemented using a variety of platforms and applications that use technology. Some examples include mobile platforms such as touch screen smartphones and tablets, as well as other interactive mediums that are created exclusively to solve a unique problem or set of problems. Interactive media is not limited to a professional environment, it can be used for any technology that responds to user actions. This can include the use of JavaScript and AJAX in web pages, but can also be used in programming languages or technology that has similar functionality.

Consoles from the fourth and fifth generation of video games, such as the Sega CD, the PlayStation and the Philips CD-i, had interactive media capabilities.

One of the most recent innovations to use interactivity that solves a problem that individuals have on a daily basis is Delta Air Lines's "Photon Shower". This device was developed as a collaboration between Delta Air Lines and Professor Russell Foster of Cambridge University. The device is designed to reduce the effect of jet lag on customers that often take long flights across time zones. The interactivity is evident because of how it solves this problem. By observing what time zones a person has crossed and matching those to the basic known sleep cycles of the individual, the machine is able to predict when a person's body is expecting light, and when it is expecting darkness. It then stimulates the individual with the appropriate light source variations for the time, as well as an instructional card to inform them of what times their body expects light and what times it expects darkness. Growth of interactive media continues to advance today, with the advent of more and more powerful machines the limit to what can be input and manipulated on a display in real time is become virtually non-existent.

== See also ==
- Artmedia
- Collective intelligence
- Digital art
- Digital media
- Immersive virtual reality
- Information theory
- Interactive advertising
- Interactive art
- Interactive cinema
- Interactive film
- International Interactive Communications Society
- Internet think tanks
- Mass collaboration
- Mass media
- Media psychology
- Media theory
- Multimedia
- New media art
- Social media
- User-generated content
- Web documentary
