= Crib talk =

Monologue by toddlers before sleeping

Crib talk or crib speech is pre-sleep monologue made by toddlers while in bed. This starts somewhere around one-and-a-half years and usually ends by about two-and-a-half years of age, though children can continue longer. It consists of conversational discourse with turn-taking, often containing semantically and syntactically coherent question-answer sequences. It may contain word play and bits of song and nursery rhyme.

Crib talk has been found in deaf children in their early sign language. It also occurs in autistic children.

== Types ==
Crib talk has been divided into three somewhat overlapping varieties.

=== Enactment sequences ===
This occurs most commonly in early monologues and is done in a low tone. It concerns using language to bring about action and occurs when playing with toys and dolls as "friends" with language embedded in ongoing play. Whilst like conversational speech, it can occur in long uninterrupted sequences in which the child describes what they are doing.

=== Proto-narrative ===
In this a child creates a story about events that have happened or imaginary events in temporal-causal sequences that can be as short as five words or as long as 150. They may include the reciting of stories that have been read to them. They occur throughout the period in which a child engages in crib talk.

=== Problem-focused ===
These concern what happened in the past, what will happen in the future and how events are organized. They incorporate descriptions used by others to enable prediction.

== Function ==
Such monologues have been argued to play a key role in providing a practice space for developing complex connected discourse, aiding a child to use language as a tool to categorize, explain and know the world, and to "clarify what may originally have been problematic or troublesome".

Such talk is more complex than that done by children in interactions with others, and this has been suggested to be due to the freedom to control what they say and so not have their cognitive abilities stretched by having to work out how to respond to what someone has just said.

While similar to private speech which usually starts after 3 years and ends at about 7, crib talk lacks its self-regulatory instructions.

== Research ==
=== Problems ===
Crib talk is a topic that has not been heavily researched within child development. The lack of research is likely due to the difficulty in transcription. Young children typically have poor pronunciation, and there is often little context to infer the meaning of a child's words, even with the help of a parent. This has limited the number of children studied and the length of time over which the development of crib talk monologues have been researched.

The children studied are also atypical in that they are the offspring of researchers or their close colleagues, and so are from highly educated backgrounds. The child studied by Katherine Nelson, for example, was highly precocious in her language abilities, which raises questions about the generality of findings on that one child.

=== Studies ===
Crib talk was first studied by Ruth Hirsch Weir on her son Anthony and published in 1962. Two other studies have been carried out by Stan Kuczaj on 14 children between 15 and 30 months – published in 1983 – and Katherine Nelson on Emily in 1989.

In 2000, crib talk research was conducted on a young girl named Nora. In this research, Nora's talk was examined before she slept as her parents recorded her from the age of 46 to 50 months. Nora's age was older than most other studies done on children's crib talk, as the average age is between 15 and 36 months. Over this period of time, a total of 60 pre-sleep recordings were collected.

Research on crib talk has also been conducted on developmentally challenged children with autism and psychotic disorders. A study was conducted on three autistic children and two psychotic children. The data collected on these children was important to compare the functionality, form, and content to normally developing children.

== Examples ==
(As spelled in transcripts)

=== Anthony ===
Anthony is here between 28 and 30 months playing at grammatical transformations and combinations.

Step on the blanket
Where is Anthony's blanket
Where is Anthony's blanket (falsetto)
Where's hiding (falsetto)
Books
Down
Down
Have the books today
I take the white blanket off
On the blanket
Under the blanket
Sleep go
What a blue blanket
What the take the blanket

=== Emily ===
(21 months)

The broke, car broke, the ..
Emmy can't go in the car.
Go in green car.
No.
Emmy go in the car.
Broken. Broken.
Their car broken, so Mommy Daddy go in their car,
Emmy Daddy go in the car,
Emmy Daddy Mommy go in the car,
broke,
Da … da,
the car … their, their, care broken (continues).

(23 months)

When mormor get me,
when Mormor mae pretty,
Mommy had a help, my sleep,
Mommy came and Mommy get, get up, time to go home.
When my slep and, and, Mormor came.
Then Mommy coming then get up, time to go ho-o-me.
Time to go home.
Drink p-water [Perrier].
Yesterday did that.
Now Emmy sleeping in regular bed.

== "In the Dark" ==
George Miller has noted that the last two verses of A. A. Milne's poem "In the Dark" in Now We Are Six echoes the verbal play of crib talk.

So—here I am in the dark alone,
There's nobody here to see;
I think to myself,
I play to myself,
And nobody knows what I say to myself;
Here I am in the dark alone,
What is it going to be?
I can think whatever I like to think,
I can play whatever I like to play,
I can laugh whatever I like to laugh,
There's nobody here but me.

I'm talking to a rabbit ...
I'm talking to the sun ...
I think I am a hundred—
I'm one.
I'm lying in a forest ...
I'm lying in a cave ...
I'm talking to a Dragon ...
I'm BRAVE.
I'm lying on my left side ...
I'm lying on my right ...
I'll play a lot tomorrow ...
...........
I'll think a lot tomorrow ...
...........
I'll laugh ...
a lot ...
tomorrow ...
(Heigh-ho !)

Goodnight

== See also ==
- Babbling
- Baby talk
- Bedtime
- Intrapersonal communication
