= Elaine Reese =

American-New Zealand psychology academic

Elaine Reese FRSNZ
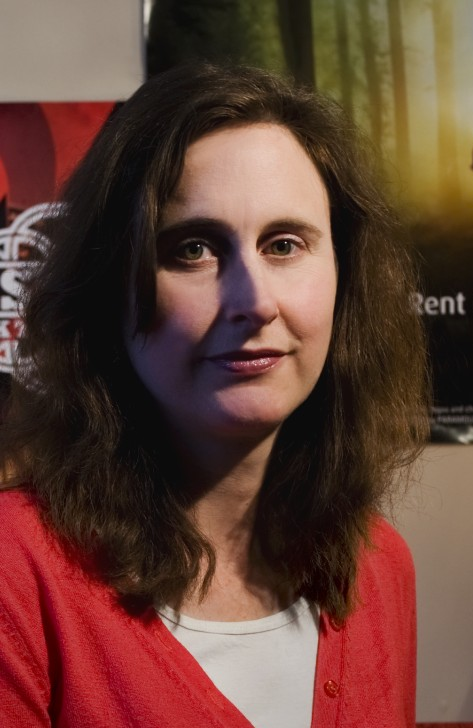
- Reese in 2008
- Education: Emory University
- Scientific career
- Fields: Psychology of early language acquisition
- Thesis: Predicting emergent literacy from mother-child conversational interactions. (1993)
- Doctoral advisor: Robyn Fivush

Jeanne Elaine Reese FRSNZ is an American-New Zealand psychology academic.

== Academic career ==
After a PhD at Emory University on early-childhood literacy, Reese moved to the University of Otago, where she rose to full professor in 2012. Reese has received four Marsden grants from the Royal Society of New Zealand.

Reese's work involves longitudinal studies of language and story formation in childhood and youth. In 2013, The Atlantic published her piece, "What Kids Learn From Hearing Family Stories", based on her research.

In 2019, Reese was elected a Fellow of the Royal Society of New Zealand.

== Selected works ==
- Reese, Elaine, Catherine A. Haden, and Robyn Fivush. "Mother-child conversations about the past: Relationships of style and memory over time." Cognitive development 8, no. 4 (1993): 403–430.
- Fivush, Robyn, Catherine A. Haden, and Elaine Reese. "Elaborating on elaborations: Role of maternal reminiscing style in cognitive and socioemotional development." Child development 77, no. 6 (2006): 1568–1588.
- Reese, Elaine, and Robyn Fivush. "Parental styles of talking about the past." Developmental psychology 29, no. 3 (1993): 596.
- Reese, Elaine, and Adell Cox. "Quality of adult book reading affects children's emergent literacy." Developmental psychology 35, no. 1 (1999): 20.
