= Gedanken über das Denken =

1922 book by German psychologist Dr. M. Engel

- Pdf of the book and book cover
- Author: Dr. M. Engel
- Language: German
- Genre: Philosophy
- Publisher: Ludwig Stein
- Publication date: 1922
- Publication place: Berlin, Germany
- Pages: 73

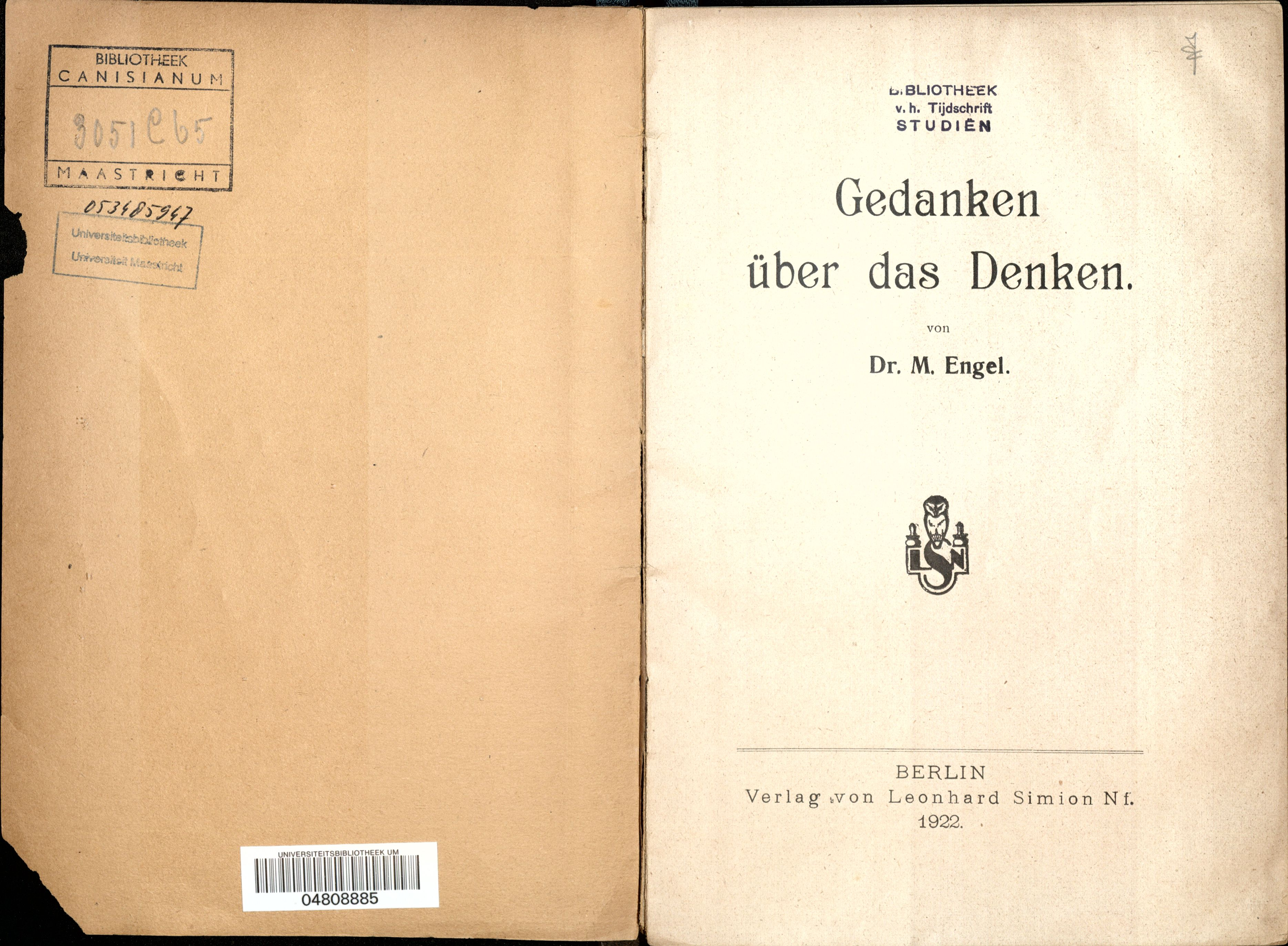
Title page

Gedanken über das Denken (translation: thoughts about thinking) is a German philosophical book by Moritz Engel. It was published in 1922 in Berlin by Verlag von Leonhard Simion as part of the series Library of Philosophy (Volume 22), which was edited by Ludwig Stein. The work sets out Engel's theory that the essence of all matter is grounded in "Geistesmaterie" (English: thinking matter). Its fundamental principle is that thought is common to all things: it is unconscious in inanimate objects, conscious in animals and humans, and abstractly conscious in humans alone. Building on this idea, Engel develops an argument that connects thinking to metaphysics, theology, and ethics.

== Context ==
Gedanken über das Denken was published shortly after the end of World War I and the November Revolution of 1918, where the German Empire collapsed and entered the unstable but intellectually vibrant period of the Weimar Republic. Berlin during the early 1920s was marked by political restructuring and economic crisis, but also by a remarkable flourishing of science, psychology, and philosophy. Due to the war but also the times following, Germany experienced a loss of meaning and a dissolution of the traditional values, which created a longing for religious hold with the focus on concrete human life and its relation to the world and god. Engels's preface states: "Our era, more than any other before it, craves an anchor to which humanity can tie the ship of life. Whether this anchor can be forged from the raw material at hand must be left to my readers to decide." In Berlin, experimental psychology flourished with Gestalt theory, while the Berlin Psychoanalytic Institute made the city a global center of psychoanalysis. Advances in neuroscience also provided new frameworks: Santiago Ramón y Cajal's and Camillo Golgi neuron doctrine, Korbinian Brodmann's cortical maps, and the founding of the Kaiser Wilhelm Institute for Brain Research in Berlin in 1914, which is now the Max Planck institute, placed the study of thought in a biological as well as philosophical context. Engel further seems influenced by the debate around Panpsychism as well, which was especially prominent in the 19th century, as he attributes to Geistesmaterie a fundamental role in all being and reality. Know for example is Arthur Schopenhauer's theory, that the essence of all things is the will.

Verlag von Leonhard Simion, a Berlin publishing press found in 1903 and is closely associated with social questions and academic literature. The editor of the book, Ludwig Stein, was a Jewish philosopher and teacher of sociology. Stein was born in Hungary and had taught for many years at the University of Bern, before moving to Berlin. There, he attracted a lot of politicians and intellectuals with his lectures. He edited several major philosophical journals and series, including the Archiv für systematische Philosophie and the Archiv für Geschichte der Philosophie.

Stein represented what he called "evolutionary criticism", which was a synthesis of Kantian epistemology and Darwinian evolution, with a focus on culture, society, and social reform. Both, Stein and Engel, dealt with similar questions. Both rejected a strict dualism of mind and matter and displayed pantheistic tendencies in presenting reality as a unified whole. However, while Stein grounded his thought in critical philosophy and evolutionary theory with practical implications for sociology and culture, Engel developed a more speculative system in which all matter was understood as "thinking mind-matter" and reality was approached primarily through metaphysical intuition.

== Content ==
The author put the book under the motto: "The glory of God is to hide things; but the glory of kings is to discover things." The book is concerned with the authors theory that the essence of all matter might be Geistesmaterie. The book is structure logically to build up the argumentative line.

Chapter 1 - Das Metaphysische Urprinzip (engl. The Metaphysical Primal Principle)

In Chapter 1 of Gedanken über das Denken, Engel presents thinking as the metaphysical primal principle, the fundamental source and essence of all reality, rather than a mere product of the brain. Everything that exists, from nature and animals to humans and even God, is composed of "thinking matter." He defines thinking as the necessary relationship between two subjects that produces a third, mediated by three components: the mental (cognitive), the bodily (physical), and the moving (mediating) element. For him there are three different forms of thinking:

1. unconscious and infallible thinking, that every living thing possesses and
2. conscious thinking, which is fallible but free and present in animals and humans and lastly
3. abstract conscious thinking, that is only possible for us humans and is regulated by the will.

Chapter 2 - Das Ding (engl. The Thing)

Engel explores, in chapter 2, the essence of things, which he believes humans can never fully comprehend. While unconscious “thing-knowledge” is inherent and highly developed in animals, plants, and even chemical compounds, humans must complement it with conscious, abstract thought. All beings, he argues, are interconnected and unconsciously orient themselves according to the essence of things. For him, nothing exists in isolation, every unity is composed of interrelated elements, ultimately grounded in the divine.

Chapter 3- Das Prinzip des Geschehens (engl. The Principle of the Happening)

Following, Engel outlines the principle of events, in which all change arises from the necessary disintegration and complementary exchange of Geistesmaterie between related bodies to maintain their properties. For him, “happening” and “becoming” mean change, while “being” signifies rest, yet true being exists only in our imagination, as nature contains only continual flow. God, he suggests, has two aspects: as pure, free being, and as necessary happening through his works. The ultimate cause of all events is mental, the act of thinking itself. This unconscious thinking, inherent in every entity, drives the breaking of forms and thereby shapes new ones. Conscious thought, by contrast, grants a limited degree of freedom from this universal necessity.

Chapter 4 - Allgemeines und Individuelles Menschliches Denken (engl. General and Individual Human Thinking)

Engel argues in chapter 4 that while all humans share a universal capacity for thought, this faculty is individually shaded, producing an infinite diversity of mental forms. He claims that the entire cosmic thinking is latently stored in every human brain, though the ability to consciously access it varies from person to person. Individual thinking develops through practice, environmental influence, and differences rooted in sex and Geistesmaterie, with Engel also alluding to a kind of mental aura and a holistic view of the mind. In reproduction, he suggests, not only general human traits but also the parents’ specific, well-practiced ways of thinking are transmitted, anticipating ideas akin to epigenetics.

Chapter 5 - Teleologie und Theologie (engl. Teleology and Theology)

In Chapter 5, Engel links teleology and theology, identifying God with the formless, thinking “mental matter” that constitutes the ultimate cause of all being. God is not omnipotent, but the goal of human development is to achieve abstract thinking and independence from flawed senses, and even from the body itself, in order to draw nearer to God. Engel envisions a cosmic cycle: from infallible unconscious thought, to concrete conscious thought, to abstract conscious thought, and finally back to the unified, infallible unconscious, conscious thought of God. For him, God is not an idea but a real, ever-present principle manifest in all things, and the path to experiencing this reality lies in transforming our unconscious mental power into conscious, living thought.

Chapter 6 - Ethik (engl. Ethics)

Lastly, in Chapter 6, Engel puts his thoughts in a practical context and defines ethics as our conscious conduct toward the environment, based on ideas elevated from perception through abstract thinking. Ethics, for him, is not founded on religion, emotion, or convention, but is simply the application of correct thinking: whoever thinks rightly will act morally. Engel rejects morality grounded solely in sympathy, restraint, or divine command; instead, justice and goodness must be recognized through reason. The goal of ethics is an inner life founded on clear, truthful thinking, which brings order and harmony both inwardly and outwardly.

== Reception ==
Dr. M. Engel tries to anticipate critique, and uses the beginning of the book to state his awareness of the lack of scientific sources and structure in his ideas. He says his proposal might seem unconvincing but he merely intended to outline his idea as a possible intellectual stimulus. Later reviews stress these points. Werner Elert, in the journal "Theologisches Literaturblatt" in 1923, criticizes Engel for offering the book as an "anchor for humanity", without having engaged with the processes of thinking in greater depth. He goes finishes the short review by saying "other countries have partly hated and partly loved us because of our philosophy. But we should do everything we can to ensure that they do not also pity us because of it." Also R. Kremer shares a similar opinion. In his review in the Bulletin D'épistémologie in 1924 he describes Engel's book as an attempt to sketch a complete philosophy - including psychology, cosmology, theodicy, and ethics - in fewer than one hundred pages. The reviewer criticized the book for lacking serious proof of its principles and judged its pantheistic parallelism as neither novel nor convincing.
