= Symbolic self-completion theory =

Psychological theory

The theory of symbolic self-completion is a psychological theory which holds that individuals seek to acquire and display symbols that are strongly related to what they perceive as the ideal self. For example, relatively effeminate boys who want to appear macho may use products associated with manliness—such as a strong cologne or a silver watch—in hopes of symbolically fulfilling their self-definitions, i.e. becoming manly. Such cases of symbolic self-completion are seen in internet communication, marketing and advertising, and consumer behavior.

== Origins ==
The theory of symbolic self-completion has its origins in the symbolic interactionist school of thought. As expressed by George Mead in Mind, Self and Society, symbolic interactionism suggests that the self is defined by the way that society responds to the individual. This idea helped shape the central ideas put forth in the book Symbolic Self-Completion, which states that individuals tend to define themselves using symbols of accomplishment and that they use symbols to communicate their self-definitions to society. Depending on the area of self-definition to which these symbols pertain, a different self-definition is thus exhibited.

== Key concepts ==
=== Self-definitional symbols ===
Self-definitional symbols are the objects that individuals use to communicate their self-definitions to society. Symbols can be both material and non-material, including anything ranging from utterances, behaviors, and socially recognized markers such as material possessions and social status. They are defined as "any facet of the person that has the potential to signal to others (who understand the symbol as related to the identity) that one possesses the identity in question." Because it is through these symbols that individuals build their self-definitions around and communicate them to society, symbols are "the building blocks of self-definition." Thus, symbols are meaningful to individuals only insofar as they adequately represent individuals' self-definitions, regarding the status of accomplishment in the areas individuals believe are important to their self-definitions. When individuals lack symbols to express their self-definitions, they seek to "display alternative symbols of attainment."

Research has shown that when individuals are deficient in any self-definitional area, this deficiency produces a state of tension and a sense of incompleteness in their self-definitions. Individuals are motivated to reduce this tension by using alternate symbols of accomplishment in the relevant self-definitional area. In the study "Symbolic Self-completion, Attempted Influence, and Self-Deprecation," Robert Wicklund, Peter Gollwitzer and James Hilton asked participants to write an essay teaching people how to perform an activity important to them and then indicate how many people should be required to revise their essays. Results of this study showed that the fewer the years of education or experience participants seemed to have in their respective activities, the higher the number of people participants thought should be required to revise their essays. The higher this number was, the more participants put themselves in a position to influence others; researchers interpreted this relationship as a means of symbolic compensation for lacking the relevant self-definitional area.

An additional part of this study asked a group of men to make a statement about their ability in the self-definitional area. Results of this part of the study showed that the less education and experience the men had, the less willing they were to provide a negative evaluation of themselves. This behavior remained consistent, even when the men were told that the attractive female confederate preferred men who were critical of themselves. This finding shows people are willing to self-symbolize even when they know the self-symbolizing behavior will be negatively received by society. Such findings indicate that individuals are more concerned with whether their behaviors will be reflective of their self-definitions than with whether the behaviors induce positive or negative judgments from others. Altogether, these findings indicate that "influencing others, as well as positive self-descriptions, can further the individual's sense of having a complete self-definition."

=== Self-definitional threats ===
Individuals' self-definitions can change for purposes of self-esteem protection and maintenance. These changes are likely to occur in consideration of the "relative performance and the psychological similarity (closeness) and dissimilarity (distance) of others." Certain dimensions of individuals' self-definitions can become "less self-definitional" when others who are psychologically similar to them outperforms them in those areas. As such, self-definitions lend themselves to change—however, individuals may opt to strengthen their self-definitions in the face of self-definitional threats. Self-definitional threat refers to a situation in which individuals feel their identities are uncertain or threatened or they feel insecure in an identity they are committed to. In such cases, individuals are more likely to value symbols that reinforce those identities.

The study "Reactions to self-discrepant feedback: Feminist attitude and symbolic self-completion" shows how a threat to one's identity also motivates individuals to engage in symbolic self-completion as a means of reducing the tension it causes. The researchers Rudolf Schiffmann and Doris Nelkenbrecher asked a group of feminist participants to subscribe to a feminist journal after being given feedback on their feminist attitudes. The women who were described as less feminist were more likely to subscribe to the feminist journal as a means of symbolically "completing" their self-definition.

Related to this study is "Psychological Antecedents of Conspicuous Consumption" by Ottmar L. Braun and Wicklund. This study was conducted in six separate studies, the first of which involved interviews of law students and attorneys. This first part of the study found that law students were more likely than practicing attorneys to think that it is important to have the "outward manifestations of an attorney," supporting the idea that individuals "striving toward a particular identity" and are "more inexperienced in that identity realm" are more prone to claim that they "can be recognized as belonging to that identity."

== Applications ==
=== Symbolic self-completion in Internet communication ===
More recent studies have shown how symbolic self-completion influences individuals' communication in online media platforms. The research follows on from studies that have previously shown that media appearances can be self-complementary symbols for demonstrating competence. However, online media also provide users with increased opportunities for self-presentation, in other words the opportunity to craft an image of oneself. For example, Cindy and Eddie Harmon-Jones and Brandon Schmeichel have shown how individuals' need for self-definition affects whether they share symbols of self-definitional attainment online. These researchers examined academic web pages and email signature files to see what types of academic departments and professors were more likely to enlist professional titles. The researchers found that the lower an academic department was ranked within National Research Council Rankings, the higher the number of professional titles the professors in that department displayed in their websites. Similarly, the lower the annual rate of publications and citations professors seemed to have, the higher the number of professional titles they enlisted in their email signatures. These correlations suggest that the enlistment of professional titles online serve as alternate symbols of accomplishment in their self-definitional areas; the more they felt they were lacking in a certain area, the more likely they were to engage in symbolic self-completion online regarding that particular area.

=== Symbolic self-completion in advertising ===
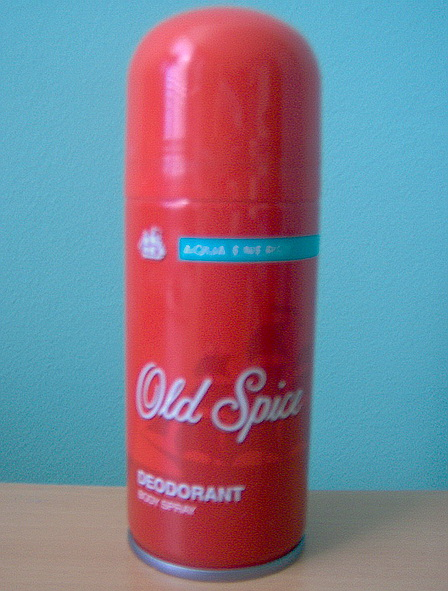
Old spice deodorant body spray

The theory of symbolic self-completion has direct application in the advertisement industry. The media leads consumers to equate advertised products targeting their feelings of "incompleteness" with self-definitional symbols to make up for that incompleteness. Although the symbols that each consumer ascribes to may be different in every case, these symbols as a whole can nonetheless be used to improve the individual consumers' perception of themselves. The product-symbols give some consumers a sense of completeness, since "self-perceptions are influenced by product use/ownership when the product has a strong user image and the consumer does not have a well formed self-image." For example, a deodorant advertisement may appeal to a male consumer's self-definitional need for masculinity, by suggesting that he will become more masculine if he uses the deodorant advertised. The Old Spice brand famously uses phrases such as "smell like a man, man" when advertising their products. The "Smell Like A Man, Man" campaign led to Old Spice becoming the number one brand of deodorant. By displaying these product-symbols, consumers improve their sense of self and feel more confident about how others might perceive them.

=== Symbolic self-completion and materialism ===
Braun and Wicklund suggest that there is a "compensatory relation between person's security" and certain kinds of conspicuous consumption, but that these relations cannot exist without individuals' perceived "incompleteness [of]" and "commitment to the identity in question." Thus, much of what is colloquially referred to as the "mid-life crisis" can be explained by the theory of symbolic self-completion. A classic example of the mid-life crisis is a 40-year-old man buying a red sports car. The man is unsure as to whether he has made the right choices in his life and if he has been leading a successful career. The man then counters his insecurity by purchasing a material object that functions as a status symbol, something that both he and others will recognize as a mark of success.

The relationship between self-completion theory and materialism is further shown through individuals' tendency to externalize their concerns about their lives by acquiring symbol-objects that reinforce and improve their self-definitions. In terms of goods/objects as individuals' status symbols, greater emphasis is placed on tangible, material objects, as they can be recognized and understood as status symbols by a wider audience than are intangible and abstract ideas. In the same vein, materialism reinforces symbolic self-completion particularly in a societies that are structured in such a way that the consumption of prestigious objects is seen as the best remedy for insecurity. This reinforcement is due to the fact that in such societies, individuals see material wealth as the best source of comforting reassurance to counter insecurity
