= Robyn Fivush =

American psychologist, educator

Academic background
- Education: State University of New York at Stony Brook; The New School for Social Research
- Alma mater: CUNY Graduate Center
- Doctoral advisor: Katherine Nelson

Academic work
- Discipline: Psychology
- Sub-discipline: Autobiographical memory development
- Institutions: Emory University
- Doctoral students: Elaine Reese

Robyn Fivush is the Samuel Candler Dobbs Professor of Psychology and Director of the Institute for the Liberal Arts at Emory University, College of Arts and Sciences in Atlanta, Georgia. She is well known for her research on parent-child narrative (i.e., story telling and reminiscing) in relation to the development of autobiographical memory. Fivush is affiliated with the Departments of Psychology and Women's Studies at Emory.

Fivush is the author of Family Narratives and the Development of an Autobiographical Self, coauthor with Susan Golombok, of the volume Gender Development. She has co-edited several volumes including The Remembering Self: Construction and Accuracy in the Self-Narrative (with Ulric Neisser), Autobiographical Memory and the Construction of A Narrative Self: Developmental and Cultural Perspectives (with Catherine Haden), Emotion in Memory and Development: Biological, Cognitive, and Social Considerations (with Jodi Quas), and The Wiley Handbook on the Development of Children's Memory (with Patricia Bauer).

== Biography ==
Fivush completed an undergraduate degree in psychology at the State University of New York at Stony Brook in 1975, and a master's degree in psychology at The New School for Social Research in 1977. Fivush continued her education at the CUNY Graduate Center, where she obtained a PhD in Developmental in 1983, under the supervision of Katherine Nelson. Her dissertation examined kindergarten children's temporally organized, script-like representations of the school day. From 1983 to 1984, Fivush was a postdoctoral fellow at the University of California at San Diego, where she collaborated with Jean Mandler on studies of young children's development of categories and their understanding of temporal sequences.

Throughout her career Fivush has focused on the development of autobiographical memory and its connection to parent-child conversational practices, gender, and self-identity. She has written over 150 scholarly articles and books. Her research has been supported by grants from the National Science Foundation, the Spencer Foundation, the John Templeton Foundation, and the National Institute of Child Health and Human Development.

== Research ==
Fivush is most well known for her research on the complex interplay between children's storytelling abilities and their creation of autobiographical memories. According to Fivush, stories serve as an important cultural tool for expressing our understanding of feelings and beliefs and the ways in which a child constructs a story about an event is directly related to their internal representation of that experience.

Children learn how to enter into narrative discourse about the past through early conversations and social interaction. This social interactionist approach is based on a dialectical model in which the child internalizes adult thought through participation in joint activities where memories are experienced and shared. During social transactions, the child begins to understand the structures necessary for storing, organizing, and recalling memories.

Research has identified two main parent communication styles: paradigmatic (characterized by repetitive questioning and a focus on categorical information) and elaborate (characterized by evaluative commenting that included information such as cause, motivations, emotions and mental states). Fivush suggests that a child's exposure to one type of narrative over another may result in a similar narrative organization in the child. Fivush conducted research indicating that mothers who used more evaluations and emotional comments during parent-child conversations about the past have children who included more evaluative and emotional information in their own autobiographical narratives later on.

Fivush suggested that in conversations with a parent about a past experience, the child may recognize that the feelings and thoughts that they had about the experience differ from their parent's feelings, by direct comparison of what each person brought to the conversation. Hence parent-guided reminiscing helps children to organize, interpret, and evaluate past experiences in ways that give them the chance to cultivate their sense of self.

Two approaches have been used in studies examining parent-child reminiscing about the past in an effort to answer the question “What does the mother contribute to the conversation?” The first focuses on the process through which the mother engages the child when talking about a previous emotional experience. Fivush and her colleagues describe two maternal styles of speech that are frequently used when conversing with young children: Mothers who exhibit a highly elaborative style provide a multitude of details about the event and foster their children's involvement in the conversation by evaluating what their child has to say. In contrast, mothers who display a highly repetitive style, tend to focus on a few details about the event, ask redundant questions of their child, and rarely encourage their child's participation in the conversation. Of these two maternal speech styles, elaboration has been found to be beneficial for children's development of autobiographical memory, literacy, narrative skills, theory of mind, and understanding of self and emotion. Children of highly elaborative mothers are more elaborative themselves when recollecting previous experiences. Other research has shown that mothers of girls are more elaborative than mothers of boys and, in turn, girls are more elaborative than boys.

The second approach focuses on content, examining maternal speech for the specific subject matter introduced to the conversation. The content approach has been primarily used to investigate gendered patterns in maternal speech as they relate to children's speech. For example, Fivush and colleagues observed that mothers talked more about emotions with girls than boys, especially when those conversations concerned experiences of sadness. Other research has shown that by the end of preschool, girls tend to talk more about emotions, and sadness in particular, when compared to boys.

Fivush has also created a scale that examines children's knowledge of their family history using 20 Yes/No questions. In this study, Fivush and her colleagues argue that knowledge of one's family history is correlated with multiple positive aspects of well-being, including higher self-esteem, better family functioning, and lower anxiety. This scale has also gained interest and attention in mainstream media outlets.

== Honors and awards ==
- Lilly Post-doctoral Teaching Award, 1985–86
- William Evans Fellow, University of Otago, Dunedin, New Zealand, Spring 2000
- Fellow, American Psychological Association
- Fellow, Association for Psychological Science

== Selected works ==
- Fivush, R. (2011). The development of autobiographical memory. Annual Review of Psychology, 62, pages 559–582.
- Fivush, R., Brotman, M. A., Buckner, J. P., & Goodman, S. H. (2000). Gender differences in parent–child emotion narratives. Sex Roles, 42(3–4), pages 233–253.
- Fivush, R., Haden, C. A., & Reese, E. (2006). Elaborating on elaborations: Role of maternal reminiscing style in cognitive and socioemotional development. Child Development, 77(6), pages 1568–1588.
- Nelson, K., & Fivush, R. (2004). The emergence of autobiographical memory: a social cultural developmental theory. Psychological Review, 111(2), pages 486–511.
- Reese, E., Haden, C. A., & Fivush, R. (1993). Mother-child conversations about the past: Relationships of style and memory over time. Cognitive Development, 8(4), pages 403–430.
