= Jodi Quas =

American psychologist (born 1969)

- Occupation: Professor of Psychology
- Awards: APA Distinguished Scientific Early Career Contributions to Psychology (2008); UC Irvine Outstanding Community Research Award (2017)

Academic background
- Education: University of California, Davis

Academic work
- Institutions: University of California, Irvine

Jodi Anne Quas (born January 31, 1969) is an applied developmental psychologist who is known for her work on how maltreatment and abuse affect memory development and children's ability to give eyewitness testimony after experiencing trauma. She holds the position of Professor of Psychological Science and Nursing Science at the University of California, Irvine School of Social Ecology.

== Biography ==
Quas was born in Chicago, IL. She attended Arizona State University, where she received her B.S. degrees in Psychology and Communication in 1992. She continued her education in Developmental Psychology at the University of California, Davis, where she complete her M.A. in 1994 and her Ph.D. in 1998. Her dissertation titled "Children's memory of experienced and nonexperienced events across repeated interviews" was conducted under the supervision of Gail Goodman.

After completing a two-year post-doctoral fellowship at the University of California, Berkeley, Quas joined the faculty of the University of California, Irvine in 2000.

Quas is the Editor of several books including Memory and Suggestibility in the Forensic Interview (with Mitchell Eisen and Gail Goodman) and Emotion in Memory and Development: Biological, Cognitive, and Social Considerations (with Robyn Fivush). She serves on the editorial board of the journals Child Abuse & Neglect and Applied Cognitive Psychology.

== Awards ==
Quas received the Louise Kidder Early Career Award from the Society for the Psychological Study of Social Issues in 2002 and the Saleem Shah Early Career Award from the American Psychology–Law Society, American Psychological Association (APA) Division 41 in 2004.

In 2008, Quas was awarded the APA Distinguished Scientific Early Career Contributions to Psychology and the Robert L. Fantz Memorial Award for Young Psychologists.

In 2017, Quas has selected to receive the Outstanding Community Research Award from the Institute for Clinical and Translational Science at University of California, Irvine in recognition of her contributions to developing "methods of enhancing children's eyewitness memory" and furthering understanding of "the effects of stress and trauma on children's development, and the consequences of legal involvement on child witnesses, victims, and even defendants."

== Research ==
Quas studies the psychological experiences and the memory development of children who have lived through traumatic abuse, including physical abuse, mental abuse, sexual abuse, and neglect. Quas and her collaborators aim to gain understanding of the exact events that occurred during an abuse scenario involving a child, so the abusers can face proper legal ramifications.

In a series of studies involving diverse cohorts of 4- to 14-year-old children, Quas and her colleagues measured brain activity while children performed challenging tasks designed to activate stress reactions in the brain. The researchers identified six distinct patterns of stress reactivity to the scenarios, and considered how such variation may help to explain how traumatic experiences can lead to adverse mental effects and alter memory development.

Quas continued to research cases of sexual abuse, but the focus shifted from children to adolescents. The main type of cases involving adolescents that Quas studied were those that involved human trafficking victims. Quas aims to get a better understanding of a victim's experience by studying the responses they give to investigators. With a better understanding of their responses, possible connections can be made in how a victim responds to certain questions.

Quas's research has been supported by the National Science Foundation.

== Representative publications ==
- Boyce, W. T., Quas, J., Alkon, A., Smider, N. A., Essex, M. J., & Kupfer, D. J. (2001). Autonomic reactivity and psychopathology in middle childhood. The British Journal of Psychiatry, 179(2), 144–150.
- Goodman, G. S., Quas, J. A., & Ogle, C. M. (2010). Child maltreatment and memory. Annual Review of Psychology, 61, 325–351.
- Quas, J. A., Bauer, A., & Boyce, W. T. (2004). Physiological reactivity, social support, and memory in early childhood. Child Development, 75(3), 797-814.
- Quas, J. A., Goodman, G. S., Bidrose, S., Pipe, M. E., Craw, S., & Ablin, D. S. (1999). Emotion and memory: Children's long-term remembering, forgetting, and suggestibility. Journal of Experimental Child Psychology, 72(4), 235–270.
- Quas, J. A., Goodman, G. S., Ghetti, S., Alexander, K. W., Edelstein, R., Redlich, A. D., ... & Haugaard, J. J. (2005). Childhood sexual assault victims: Long-term outcomes after testifying in criminal court. Monographs of the Society for Research in Child Development, 70(2), i-139.
- Quas, J. A., Goodman, G. S., & Jones, D. P. (2003). Predictors of attributions of self‐blame and internalizing behavior problems in sexually abused children. Journal of Child Psychology and Psychiatry, 44(5), 723–736.
