= Simona Ghetti =

Professor of Psychology

- Education: Università di Padova; University of California, Davis
- Occupations: Professor, University of California, Davis

Simona Ghetti is Professor of Psychology at the University of California, Davis, where she is affiliated with the University of California Davis Center for Mind and Brain. She is known for her research on the development of episodic memory, reconstructive memory, and metamemory in youth, with a specific focus on individuals who have had traumatic experiences.

Ghetti was the recipient of multiple awards commending her work, including the Early Career Research Achievement Award from the Society for Research in Child Development in 2007, the Boyd McCandless Early Career Award from the American Psychological Association (Division 7, Developmental Psychology) in 2009, and the Distinguished Scientific Award for Early Career Contribution to Psychology from the American Psychological Association in 2010.

Ghetti co-edited, with Anna Mestitz, a volume titled Victim-Offender Mediation with Youth Offenders in Europe: An Overview and Comparison of 15 Countries. This volume provides a cross-cultural perspective on the process of victim-offender mediation, also called restorative justice conferencing, which provides victims with opportunities to meet with their offenders in safe and structured settings. Ghetti co-edited the volume Origins and Development of Recollection: Perspectives from Psychology and Neuroscience with Patricia Bauer. This book summarizes research on the development of the ability to recollect or recall personal events, which provides the basis for developing a sense of life history or autobiographical memory.

== Biography ==
Simona Ghetti received her B.S. degree in Psychology (Summa Cum Laude) at the Università di Padova, Italy in 1995. She attended graduate school at the University of California, Davis where she obtained her Ph.D. in psychology in 2002. Upon graduation, Ghetti worked as a researcher at the National Research Council, Bologna, Italy. She returned to University of California Davis as a faculty member in 2005 and was promoted to Full Professor in 2013.

Ghetti's research has been supported through grants from the National Institutes of Health and the National Science Foundation. She was recipient of a 21st Century Science Initiative Award from the James F. McDonnell Foundation (2010), and a Science of Prospection Scholar Award through the University of Pennsylvania and the John Templeton Foundation (2014).

== Research ==
Simona Ghetti uses behavioral and neuroimaging methods to study the development of memory in children. Her lab has conducted numerous studies of neural basis of the development episodic memory, with a specific focus on the hippocampus. Ghetti is perhaps best known for her research on early memories of traumatic events, which has implications for the eyewitness testimony as well as clinical implications. In one of her collaborative studies indicating the negative effects of long-term memories of childhood sexual abuse, victims who had more accurate memories were more likely to experience post traumatic stress disorder (PTSD).

== Representative Publications ==
- Goodman, G. S., Ghetti, S., Quas, J. A., Edelstein, R. S., Alexander, K. W., Redlich, A. D., ... & Jones, D. P. (2003). A prospective study of memory for child sexual abuse: New findings relevant to the repressed-memory controversy. Psychological Science, 14(2), 113–118.
- Ghetti, S., & Lee, J. (2011). Children's episodic memory. Wiley Interdisciplinary Reviews: Cognitive Science, 2(4), 365–373.
- Ghetti, S., Qin, J., & Goodman, G. S. (2002). False memories in children and adults: Age, distinctiveness, and subjective experience. Developmental Psychology, 38(5), 705–718.
- Ghetti, S., & Angelini, L. (2008). The development of recollection and familiarity in childhood and adolescence: Evidence from the dual‐process signal detection model. Child Development, 79(2), 339–358.
