= Patricia H. Miller =

Developmental psychologist

- Citizenship: United States of America
- Occupation: Professor of Psychology
- Awards: Fellow, American Psychological Association; Fellow, Association for Psychological Science

Academic background
- Education: University of Kansas, University of Minnesota

Academic work
- Institutions: San Francisco State University

Patricia Hackney Miller (born 1945) is an American developmental psychologist known for her research on cognitive development during early childhood. She holds the position of Professor of Psychology at San Francisco State University.

Miller is a Fellow of the American Psychological Association (APA), Division 1 (General) and Division 7 (Developmental Psychology) and a Fellow the Association for Psychological Science. She served as President of APA Division 7 from 2008-2010.

== Biography ==
Miller was raised in rural Kansas and, as a child, attended a one-room school. Her interest in psychology began as an undergraduate at the University of Kansas taking Introductory Psychology in her first semester. At first she aspired to be a clinical psychologist but turned to experimental psychology under the mentorship of Frances Degen Horowitz. After graduating from the University of Kansas in 1966, Miller attended the Institute of Child Development at the University of Minnesota where she studied social cognitive development (theory of mind) with John Flavell. As a graduate student, Miller worked as a research assistant with Eleanor Gibson and conducted experiments on rabbits and kittens on the visual cliff. She received her Ph.D from University of Minnesota in 1970.

Miller joined the faculty of the University of Michigan in 1970 and remained there until 1977. She moved to the University of Florida in 1977 and was Associate Dean of the College of Liberal Arts and Sciences (1995–1999). Her research at the University of Florida on memory development was supported by the National Science Foundation.

Miller joined the faculty of the University of Georgia in 2001 where she was also Director of the Institute of Women's Studies (2001–2005). She moved to San Francisco State University in 2010.

Miller is the author of the popular textbook Theories of Developmental Psychology. She also co-authored the textbook Cognitive Development (with John Flavell and Scott Miller) and co-edited Toward a Feminist Developmental Psychology (with Ellin Kofsky Scholnick) and Conceptual Development: Piaget's Legacy (with Scholnick, Katherine Nelson, and Susan Gelman).

== Representative work ==
- Best, J. R., Miller, P. H., & Jones, L. L. (2009). Executive functions after age 5: Changes and correlates. Developmental Review, 29(3), 180-200.
- Best, J. R., & Miller, P. H. (2010). A developmental perspective on executive function. Child Development, 81(6), 1641-1660.
- Best, J. R., Miller, P. H., & Naglieri, J. A. (2011). Relations between executive function and academic achievement from ages 5 to 17 in a large, representative national sample. Learning and Individual Differences, 21(4), 327-336.
- Miller, P. H., & Aloise, P. A. (1989). Young children's understanding of the psychological causes of behavior: A review. Child Development, 60(2), 257-285.
- Miller, P. H., Kessel, F. S., & Flavell, J. H. (1970). Thinking about people thinking about people thinking about...: A study of social cognitive development. Child Development, 41(3), 613-623.
- Miller, P. H., Blessing, J. S., & Schwartz, S. (2006). Gender differences in high‐school students’ views about science. International Journal of Science Education, 28(4), 363-381.
