= Patricia Bauer =

Canadian psychologist and academic

Patricia J. Bauer
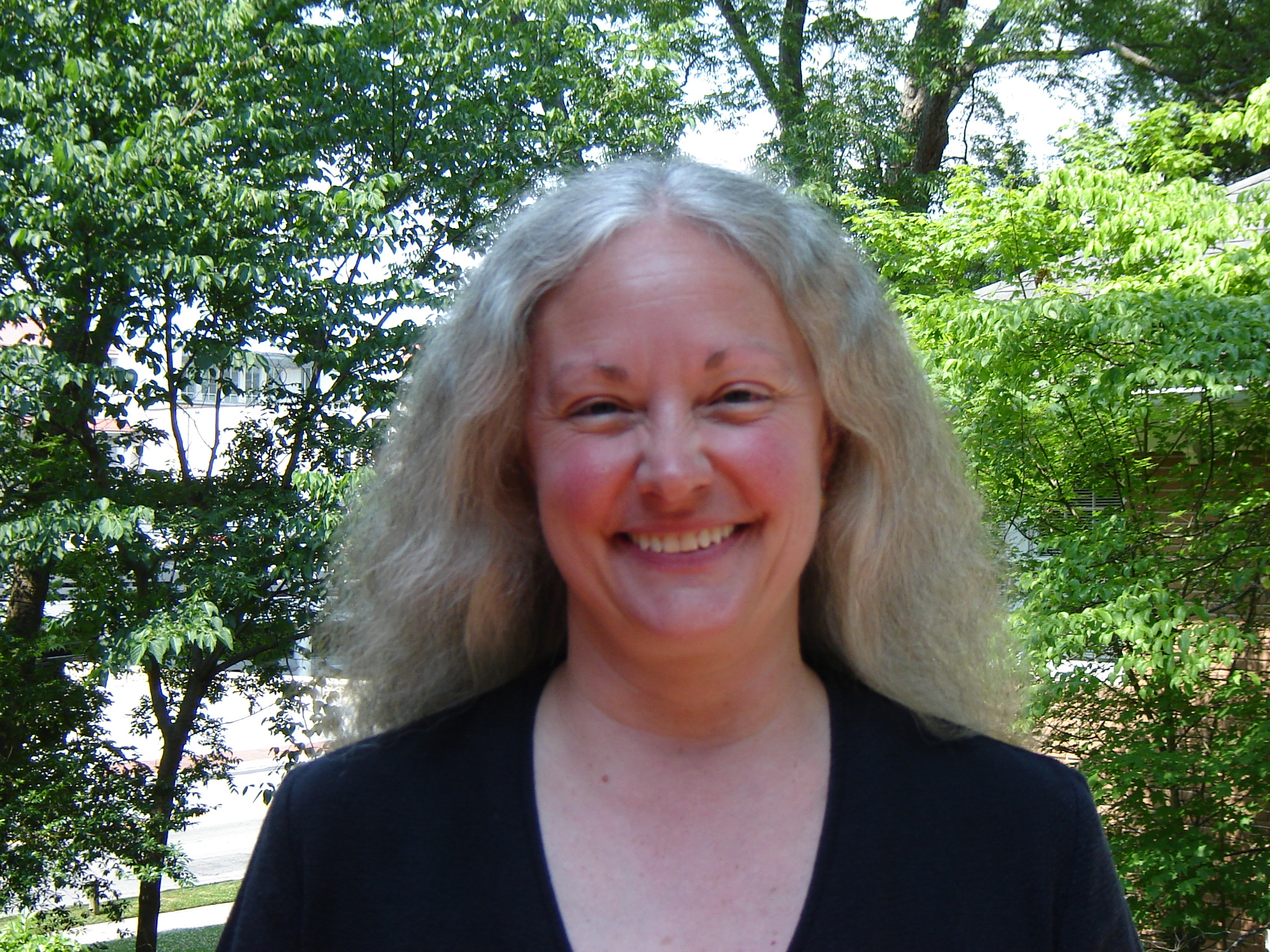
- Born: February 27, 1957 (age 69); Davenport, Iowa
- Occupations: Professor of Psychology, Emory University

Patricia J. Bauer (born 1957) is Asa Griggs Candler Professor of Psychology at Emory University. She is known for her research in the field of cognitive development, with a specific focus on how children develop their earliest memories and how their memory is influenced by parents, peers, and the environment around them. Her research has explored the phenomenon of childhood amnesia and how social, cognitive, and neural changes relate to the development of autobiographical memory.

Bauer was awarded the American Psychological Association Distinguished Scientific Award for an Early Career Contribution to Psychology in the Developmental Area (1993) and the American Psychological Foundation Robert L. Fantz Award (1993). Her book Remembering the Times of Our Lives: Memory in Infancy and Beyond was named Book of the Year (2007) by the Cognitive Development Society. With Simona Ghetti, Bauer edited the volume Origins and Development of Recollection: Perspectives from Psychology and Neuroscience (2012). With Robyn Fivush, she edited The Wiley Handbook on the Development of Children's Memory (2014). Bauer has served as editor of the Journal of Cognition and Development (2005–2009), the Society for Research in Child Development Monographs (2013–2018), and Psychological Science (2020–present).

== Biography ==
Bauer received her Bachelor of Sciences degree in psychology at Indiana Central University in 1981. She went to graduate school at Miami University where she obtained her M.A. and Ph.D. in Experimental Developmental Psychology. In graduate school, Bauer was mentored by Cecilia Shore, who introduced her to Piaget's genetic epistemology. Cecilia's guidance educated her in applying constructivist theory to a variety of issues regarding language and cognition.

Upon graduation, Bauer completed a post-doctoral fellowship at the University of California, San Diego, where she conducted studies of categorization in infants and young children in collaboration with Jean Mandler.

Prior to joining the faculty of Emory University in 2007, Bauer held faculty positions at the Institute of Child Development at the University of Minnesota (1989-2005) and at Duke University (2005-2007). While at the University of Minnesota, Bauer was awarded the Horace T. Morse University of Minnesota Alumni Association Award for Outstanding Contributions to Undergraduate Education (2002). Here, she put together a small team of intelligent and ambitious graduate and undergraduate students, motivated to chase further research on the origins of long-term memory and its theoretical shift from infancy to early childhood.

== Research ==
Bauer is widely recognized for her research on the early development of memory, with a specific focus on autobiographical memory of people, objects, and events of personal significance. She utilizes various methods to carry out her research, including eye-tracking and electrophysiological measures. Bauer's work highlights a number of factors that contribute to the formation of memories, including the environment in which an event occurred and its emotional intensity, and the extent to which the information to relates to other pieces of information already stored in memory.

In one of her papers co-authored with Mandler, Bauer tested the ability of toddlers to remember events and whether their abilities were comparable to those of preschool-age children as well as adults. This study demonstrated the importance of causal connections and temporal structure in supporting children's earliest event memories. Toddlers, like older children and adults, are more likely to remember a series of events if causal relationships were present that linked the elements in the series. Other notable work on the development of memory is Bauer and colleagues' SRCD monograph on Parameters of Remembering and Forgetting in the Transition from Infancy to Early Childhood.

== Representative publications ==
- Bauer, P. J. (1996). What do infants recall of their lives? Memory for specific events by one-to two-year-olds. American Psychologist, 51(1), 29–41.
- Bauer, P. J., & Mandler, J. M. (1989). One thing follows another: Effects of temporal structure on 1-to 2-year-olds' recall of events. Developmental Psychology, 25(2), 197–206.
- Bauer, P. J., & Mandler, J. M. (1992). Putting the horse before the cart: The use of temporal order in recall of events by one-year-old children. Developmental Psychology, 28(3), 441–452.
- de Haan, M., Bauer, P. J., Georgieff, M. K., & Nelson, C. A. (2000). Explicit memory in low-risk infants aged 19 months born between 27 and 42 weeks of gestation. Developmental Medicine and Child Neurology, 42(5), 304–312.
- Mandler, J. M., & Bauer, P. J. (1988). The cradle of categorization: Is the basic level basic? Cognitive Development, 3(3), 247–264.
- Thanujeni Pathman, Anousheh Shafa, Elizabeth A. Vogt, Patricia J. Bauer (2024): Children's and adults' memory for the order of events in a museum: A preliminary study about temporal memory and its development using photo-taking and event-related potentials, Neuropsychologia, Volume 196, 2024, 108835, https://doi.org/10.1016/j.neuropsychologia.2024.108835.
