= Katherine Nelson =

American psychologist

- Citizenship: American
- Occupation: Distinguished Professor Emerita
- Spouse: Richard R. Nelson
- Awards: SRCD Distinguished Scientific Contributions to Child Development Award (1999); APA G. Stanley Hall Award for Distinguished Contribution to Developmental Psychology (2008); Jean Piaget Society Lifetime Achievement Award (2017)

Academic background
- Education: Oberlin College; University of California, Los Angeles

Katherine Nelson (1930 – August 10, 2018) was an American developmental psychologist, and professor.

== Education ==
Nelson completed her dissertation research on the organization of free recall of verbal information in children at the University of California, Los Angeles, under the guidance of W. E. Jeffrey and T. Trabasso. She was a member of the faculty of Yale University prior to joining the faculty of the Graduate Center of the City University of New York in 1978.

== Career ==
Nelson was a professor emerita of psychology at the Graduate Center of the City University of New York.

Jerome Bruner described Nelson as a "contextual functionalist" seeking "the contexts that give human acts their meaning" while investigating the functions that these acts play in longer-term scenarios. Similarly, Michael Tomasello highlighted Nelson's emphasis on "the function of language and linguistic concepts in children's larger conceptual and social lives and, conversely, how children's emerging understanding of the function of linguistic symbols in larger conceptual and social structures makes language acquisition possible." In addition to conducting seminal research on children's language development and its relation to social and cognitive development, Nelson studied childhood amnesia and the development of episodic memory.

== Awards and honors ==
In 1999, Nelson was one of four recipients of the Society for Research in Child Development award for Distinguished Scientific Contributions to Child Development. In 2001, a symposium in her honor was held as part of the Biennial Meeting of the Society for Research in Child Development, and in 2002 the Journal of Cognition and Development published a special issue in her honor. In 2008, Nelson received the G. Stanley Hall Award for Distinguished Contribution to Developmental Psychology and her book Young Minds in Social Worlds: Experience, Meaning, and Memory received the Maccoby Book Award from the American Psychological Association, Division 7. In 2017, she was honored by the Jean Piaget Society with a Lifetime Achievement Award.

== Books ==
Nelson's book Narratives from the Crib (Harvard University Press, 2006) investigates the cognitive and linguistic development of a two-year-old, based on an in-depth analysis of the child's crib talk (pre-sleep monologues).

Her book Language in Cognitive Development: Emergence of the Mediated Mind (Cambridge University Press, 1998) stands in contrast to the theories of Jean Piaget and others that cognitive and linguistic development are independent of each other, and instead views language acquisition as a bridge that connects a child's social and cultural growth with his or her growing knowledge of the world. In collaboration with her former doctoral student Robyn Fivush, she developed a theory that parent-child reminiscing about the past plays a foundational role in the formation of autobiographical memory.

She is also the author or co-author of:

- Structure and Strategy in Learning to Talk (University of Chicago Press, 1973)
- Young Children's Knowledge of Relational Terms: Some ifs, ors, and buts (with Lucia A. French, Springer-Verlag, 1985)
- Making Sense: The Acquisition of Shared Meaning (Academic Press, 1985)
- Event Knowledge: Structure and Function in Development (with Janice Gruendel, Psychology Press, 1986)
- Sociocultural Psychology: Theory and Practice of Doing and Knowing (with Ethel Tobach, Cambridge University Press, 1995)
- Conceptual Development: Piaget's Legacy (with Ellin Kofsky Scholnick, Susan A. Gelman, and Patricia H. Miller, Psychology Press, 1999)
- Young Minds in Social Worlds: Experience, Meaning, and Memory (Harvard University Press, 2007)

== Selected articles ==
- Nelson, K. (1973). Structure and strategy in learning to talk. Monographs of the Society for Research in Child Development, 38(1/2), pages 1–135.
- Nelson, K. (1974). Concept, word, and sentence: Interrelations in acquisition and development. Psychological Review, 81(4), pages 267–285.
- Nelson, K. (1981). Individual differences in language development: Implications for development and language. Developmental Psychology, 17(2), pages 170–187.
- Nelson, K. (1988). Constraints on word learning? Cognitive Development, 3(3), 221–246.
- Nelson, K. (1993). The psychological and social origins of autobiographical memory. Psychological Science, 4(1), pages 7–14.
- Nelson, K., Skwerer, D. P., Goldman, S., Henseler, S., Presler, N., & Walkenfeld, F. F. (2003). Entering a community of minds: An experiential approach to ‘theory of mind’. Human Development, 46(1), pages 24–46.
- Nelson, R. R., & Nelson, K. (2002). Technology, institutions, and innovation systems. Research Policy, 31(2), pages 265–272.
