= Bedtime procrastination =

Psychological phenomenon

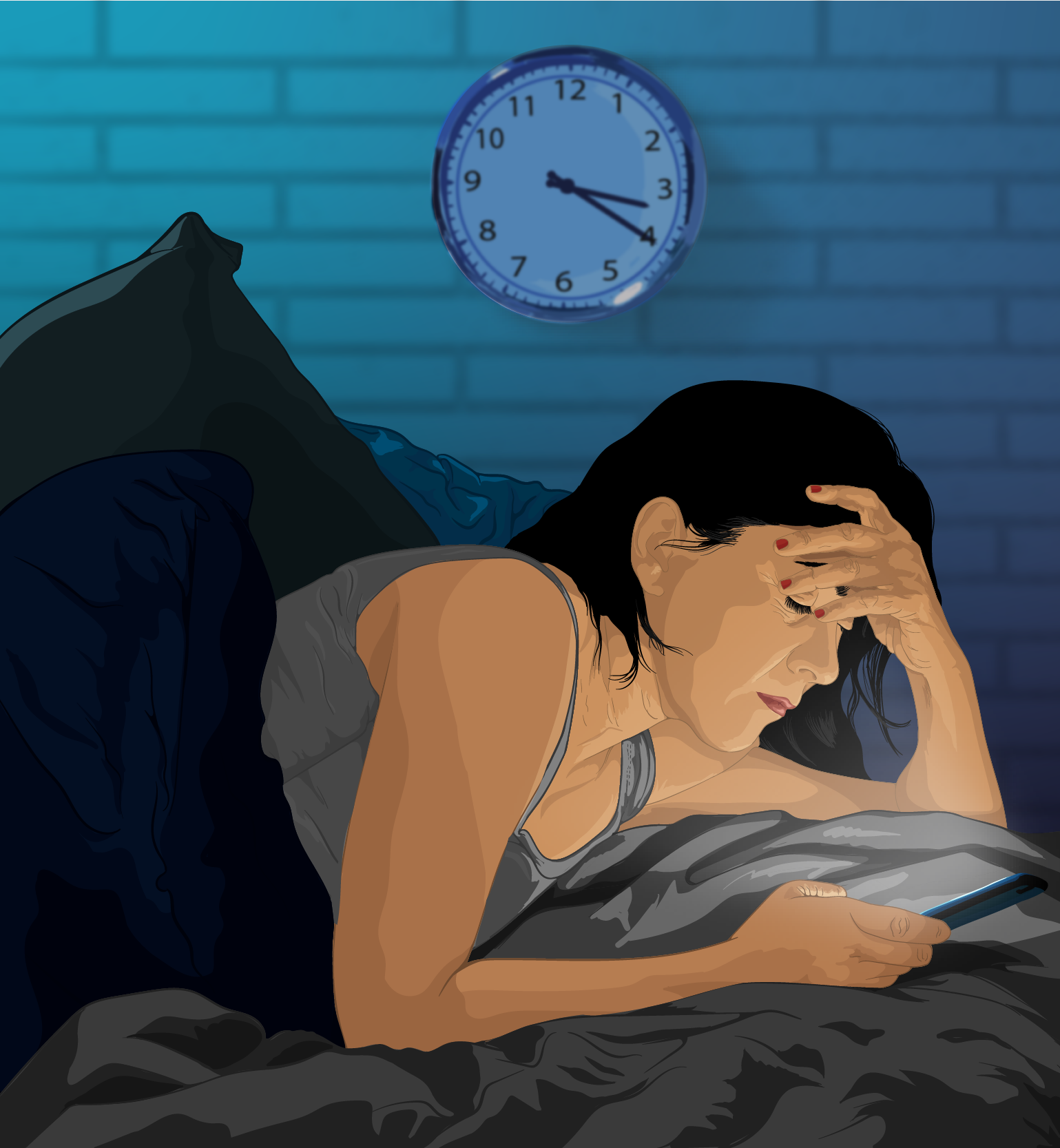
Problematic smartphone use can contribute to a person's decision to stay awake late into the night.

Bedtime procrastination is a psychological phenomenon that involves voluntarily delaying going to bed despite the risk of foreseeable consequences the following day, such as fatigue. It can be partly unintentional, where a person loses track of time. Bedtime procrastination has been linked to shorter sleep duration, poorer sleep quality, and greater fatigue during the day.

Research has distinguished between bedtime procrastination and general procrastination, finding that the two are related but distinct. Bedtime-specific factors, such as electronic devices and stimulating pre-bed activities, matter more than a person's general tendency to procrastinate.

The Chinese term revenge bedtime procrastination refers to intentionally delaying sleep in response to a perceived lack of control over the events of the day.

== Origin of name ==
The term "bedtime procrastination" became popular based on a 2014 study from the Netherlands.

== Causes and theoretical explanations ==
An individual may procrastinate sleep due to a variety of causes. Researchers have studied bedtime procrastination through both proximate explanations, which focus on the immediate psychological mechanisms that cause an individual to delay sleep, and ultimate explanations, which explore why humans might have developed a tendency for this behaviour over time. There is still little research using evolutionary frameworks to study bedtime procrastination, but recent studies have begun to address this gap.

The person may not consciously be avoiding sleep, but rather continuing to complete activities they perceive as more enjoyable than sleep (such as watching television, browsing social media or playing video games). There are many distractions in the 21st century; obtaining distractions to delay sleep is much easier than in earlier decades. These distractions create a sleep environment filled with artificial lighting and constant stimulation that differs from ancestral conditions, a phenomenon known as evolutionary mismatch. Researchers have proposed that mechanisms such as hyper-vigilance, which evolved to detect physical threats, may be triggered by non-threatening modern stimuli, contributing to sleep disruption. Evolutionary research suggests that sleep duration across species is shaped by tradeoffs between sleep and other activities, with humans sacrificing sleep when alternative behaviours offer greater immediate value.

=== Smartphone use ===
Behavioural explanations have also focused on the role of technology. Problematic smartphone use directly causes bedtime procrastination. People who extensively use a smartphone are more likely to delay their bedtime because they find it hard to stop using the phone and keep getting distracted by it before going to sleep. These people enjoy the temporary satisfaction of smartphone use and want more time to entertain themselves. Smartphone apps deliver content through variable reinforcement schedules, where rewards appear at unpredictable intervals, a pattern known to produce persistent behaviour that is resistant to stopping. In addition, bedtime procrastination plays a mediated role between smartphone addiction and depression and anxiety. Habitual smartphone overuse results in bedtime procrastination, and shorter sleep duration and lower sleep quality may trigger many negative emotions responsible for depression and anxiety.

In a 2022 cross-cultural study evaluated 210 employees in the United States and 205 employees in China. The results show that off-time work-related smartphone use may provoke bedtime procrastination. The negative impact of smartphone use on bedtime procrastination is more significant in the United States than in China. The research shows that employees in the United States have a more resistant attitude than employees in China when it comes to work after hours, resulting in a higher self-control depletion and a higher possibility of bedtime procrastination. Researchers have also found that bedtime procrastination's main causes are low-self control and increased stress.

Statistics show that disturbed sleep patterns are increasingly common. In 2013, an estimated 40% of U.S. adults slept less than the recommended amount. In Belgium, where data was collected for the study, 30% of adults reported difficulty sleeping, and 13% reported taking sleeping pills.

=== Self-regulation ===
A 2014 study of Dutch individuals concluded that low self-regulation could cause bedtime procrastination. The study suggested that bedtime procrastination is linked to low self-control, a stable component of self-regulation, rather than just deliberate avoidance of sleep. The researchers interpreted this through Roy Baumeister's strength model of self-regulation, which proposes that self-regulation is a limited resource that depletes through repeated use, leaving individuals with less capacity to resist engaging in enjoyable activities by bedtime.

Due to COVID-19, 40% more people have experienced sleeping problems. A 2021 study found that boredom also leads to bedtime procrastination. Boredom increases inattention, which leads to increased bedtime procrastination. Another 2014 study consisting of 145 people found that 43% of the self-labelled bedtime procrastinators did not have a set bedtime or routine. This study suggests and emphasizes that inattention is a big factor in bedtime procrastination because it is not necessary for explicit awareness to be active when procrastinating. People do not procrastinate intentionally, but as a result of poor self-regulation. Physiological evidence supports that individuals with lower self-regulatory capacity are more prone to bedtime procrastination. Research using heart rate variability, a biological marker of the body's ability to regulate impulses, has found that lower resting levels are associated with greater bedtime procrastination. The same study found that behavioural, emotional, and physiological components of self-regulation each contributed independently, suggesting it is not a unitary construct. Longitudinal research found bidirectional relationships between bedtime procrastination and sleep quality, and proposed that the two may be self-reinforcing; poor sleep quality may impair self-regulatory capacity, increasing vulnerability to further bedtime procrastination.

A 2018 study of 19 people identified three bedtime procrastination themes: deliberate procrastination, mindless procrastination and strategic delay. Deliberate procrastination results from a person consciously believing they deserve more time for themselves, causing them to intentionally stay up later. Mindless procrastination results from losing track of time during one's daily tasks and consequently staying up later without intending to. Strategic delay results from purposely staying up late in order to fall asleep easier. Strategic delay has also been found to be linked with undiagnosed insomnia.

=== Rumination ===
Rumination, a pattern of repetitive negative thinking, has been associated with bedtime procrastination, whereas more constructive forms of reflection have not. Rumination has been found to increase negative emotions, which promotes bedtime procrastination as individuals turn to enjoyable activities to manage their mood. More broadly, individuals who dwell on negative past experiences are more likely to use these pre-bed activities and delay sleep, while those who are more focused on future consequences tend to show lower levels of bedtime procrastination.

=== Temporal discounting ===
Temporal discounting is the tendency to favour immediate rewards over delayed benefits. At bedtime, the immediate pleasure of continuing an enjoyable activity may outweigh the distant benefits of a good night's sleep. University students planned wake-up times on more than twice as many nights as bedtimes, with researchers suggesting that the more immediate consequences of oversleeping motivated planning more than the delayed effects of a late bedtime. When bedtime plans existed, they were frequently overrun, particularly among those with higher bedtime procrastination scores. Temporal discounting has been interpreted within evolutionary frameworks as an adaptive cognitive bias for ancestral environments where the future was uncertain. Some researchers suggest that in modern environments this tendency may be less adaptive, though this modelling work has been conducted across species rather than in the context of human sleep specifically. Researchers have noted that evidence for the role of temporal discounting in bedtime procrastination is largely correlational.

=== Life history theory ===
Some researchers have proposed broader evolutionary explanations. Life history theory proposes that in unpredictable environments, prioritising immediate rewards over long-term planning carries lower risk, and procrastination may be a manifestation of this present-focused strategy. A study of 453 young adults in China found that those who grew up in harsher environments exhibited a fast life history strategy, characterised by prioritising immediate rewards, and reported a lower sense of control over their daily lives. The study proposed that this lower sense of control partly explained their greater tendency toward bedtime procrastination.

== Psychological influences ==
Bedtime procrastinators engaged in more leisure and social activities in the three hours before bedtime. High and low procrastinators spend similar amounts of time watching TV and using computers. In the three hours before bedtime, high bedtime procrastinators spent 79.5 minutes on their phones, while low bedtime procrastinators spent 17.6 minutes on their phones. People who stayed up late reported more symptoms of depression and anxiety, lower sleep quality, and a higher risk of insomnia than those who went to bed earlier.

Research from a survey of 317 participants in 2022 has shown that people's subjective perception of time is associated with bedtime procrastination. Sleep time perceived as the end of the day prompts people to think about the rest of their time. In the research, people who procrastinate before sleep often use their evening time to enjoy their favorite activities as a reward for the hard work of the day, focusing on immediate rewards and immediate benefits. Bedtime procrastination causes people to feel that time is passing quickly, which can lead to anxiety and stress.

For individuals who suffer from insomnia, bedtime is an abominable time. Sleep can become a task and a burden that increases people's worry about getting enough sleep, leading to nervousness, and increases their psychological stress. This can lead to a variety of negative health outcomes, including fatigue, mood swings, and difficulty concentrating.

Women, students, and "night owls" (later chronotypes) are most likely to experience bedtime procrastination. Differences in chronotypes may have served an adaptive function in ancestral groups by ensuring that some people remain alert to threats while others sleep. In modern environments, later chronotypes experience more bedtime procrastination because their biological clocks clash with early daily routines. However, other researchers argue that this mismatch increases the demand for self-regulation rather than replacing it as an explanation. People with high daytime stress levels are more prone to bedtime procrastination.

Bedtime procrastination comes in many other forms as well, such as delaying going to sleep (sleep procrastination) and delaying the time trying to fall asleep (while in bed procrastination). One-third of Chinese students showed signs of sleep procrastination.

=== Revenge bedtime procrastination ===
The term revenge bedtime procrastination describes delaying sleep in an attempt to exercise control over one's spare time at night, in response to a perceived lack of control over the events of the day.

The "revenge" prefix is believed to have been added first in China in the late 2010s, possibly relating to the 996 working hour system (72 hours per week), since many feel that it is the only way they can take any control over their daytime self. Writer Daphne K. Lee popularised the term in a Twitter post that used the term, describing it as "a phenomenon in which people who don't have much control over their daytime life refuse to sleep early in order to regain some sense of freedom during late night hours."

== Signs and symptoms ==
According to researchers, there are three key factors that differentiate between bedtime procrastination and staying up late:

- The individual experiencing bedtime procrastination must be decreasing their overall sleep time every night.
- There must be no reason for them to stay up late (such as location or sickness).
- The individual must be aware that the loss in sleep is impacting them negatively, but they do not care to change their routine.

People with higher cell phone use report more signs of bedtime procrastination. The media environment creates the atmosphere for sleep procrastination by providing plenty of fun pastimes before lights out.

== Consequences ==
Individuals who experience bedtime procrastination are likely to face effects related to the delayed sleep. A meta-analysis found that greater bedtime procrastination was associated with poorer sleep quality, shorter sleep duration, and increased fatigue throughout the day.

Bedtime procrastination results in poor sleep quality and can be a sign of poor self-regulation. Bedtime procrastinators are more likely to lose willpower, lose control of themselves, and fidget all the time. It is easy to cause a state of low interest, high dissatisfaction, and high distraction.

Bedtime procrastination can cause sleep deprivation, which leads to slow thinking, low attention levels, bad memory, bad decision making, stress, anxiety, and irritation. If sleep deprivation is not treated quickly, long-term consequences can include heart disease, diabetes, obesity, weakened immune system, pain, hormone issues, and mental health issues.

Bedtime procrastination can lead to short sleep, which can increase psychosis and may cause people to suffer from depression.

People who experience bedtime procrastination may also develop insomnia, suffering from sleep disturbance and may feel the need to acquire sleeping pills to fall asleep. Bedtime procrastination can lead a person to nap or experience microsleep throughout the day to compensate for lack of sleep.

== Prevention ==
=== Mental contrasting with implementation intentions ===
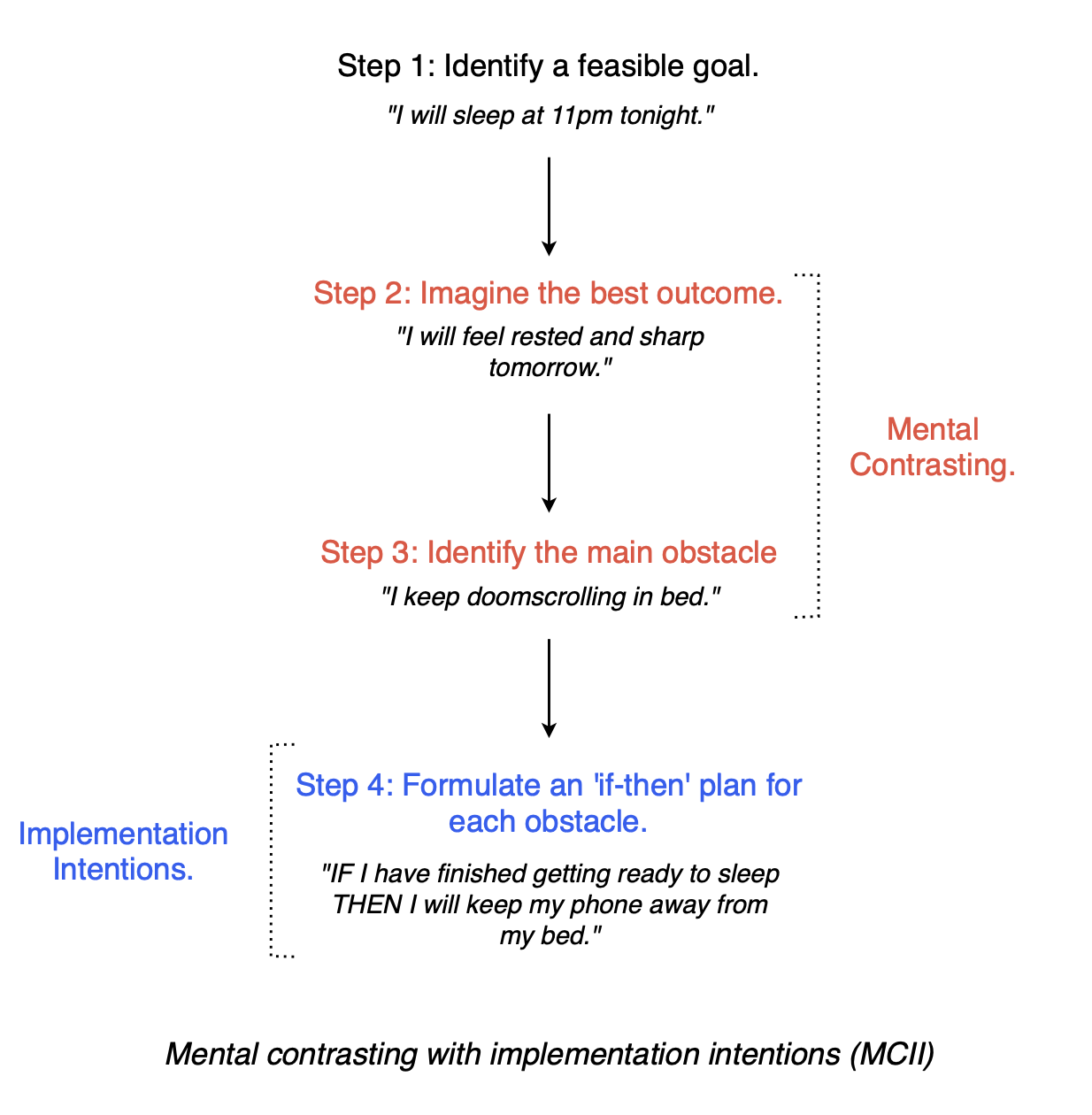
Flowchart illustrating the four steps of mental contrasting with implementation intentions (MCII) applied to bedtime procrastination.

Mental Contrasting with Implementation Intentions (MCII) is a self-regulation strategy that combines two techniques. Mental contrasting involves imagining a desired future outcome and then identifying obstacles in one's current reality, highlighting the gap between the two. Implementation intentions are if-then plans that create automatic cue-response links, so that the desired response is triggered without requiring conscious effort. The full process takes approximately five minutes: the individual identifies a feasible goal, imagines the best outcome of achieving it, identifies the main obstacle, and formulates an if-then plan to address it.

Studies suggest MCII is more effective at reducing bedtime procrastination than implementation intentions alone, as these have shown mixed results, narrowing the gap between planned and actual bedtimes but not improving sleep duration. After three weeks of MCII, participants went to bed on average 33 minutes earlier, compared to 14 minutes for a control group. Using MCII daily may be more effective, with participants procrastinating approximately 19 minutes less than those who performed it once, as daily practice allows individuals to adjust their bedtime goal to each night's circumstances. However, these findings rely on self-reported bedtimes.

=== BED-PRO ===
BED-PRO is a behavioural intervention in which individuals first identify the emotional or behavioural function of their bedtime procrastination through functional analysis, then learn replacement behaviours that fulfil the same need without delaying sleep, reinforced through imagery training to support implementation. A study on 20 young adults showed that this reduced participant bedtime procrastination duration by an average of 63.8%, with additional improvements in sleep efficiency and daytime sleepiness maintained at one-month follow-up. A subsequent randomised controlled trial on 60 young adults supported this effect.

=== Media use interventions ===
Media use interventions as treatment strategies for sleep insufficiency have been targeted mainly at reducing the volume of media use. This might not be a feasible scenario for the contemporary and future media user, given the immense proliferation of media at all times and the experience of being connected 24/7. Using a self-control perspective on electronic media use and bedtime procrastination could provide novel ways of approaching this issue. As the endpoint of media use (which often implies getting ready to go to bed) is dependent on the level of self-control, strategies aimed at improving self-control could be a valuable avenue for future exploration.

=== Self-help strategies ===
Several ways which may prevent bedtime procrastination include:

- Turning off electronic devices at least one hour before bed. In a darker environment, humans produce the sleep hormone melatonin. Therefore, people should limit the light they receive before going to sleep.
- Taking a hot shower or bath to reduce stresses.
- Writing down thoughts, feelings, and experiences that stood out throughout the day.
- Maintaining a regular wake-up time and bedtime, including on non-working days.
- Setting a bedtime routine.
- Snacking on nuts, seeds, and pulses, which are sources of tryptophan, which helps produce melatonin.
- Avoiding alcohol or caffeine late in the afternoon or evening.
- Taking melatonin supplements (but exercise caution)
- Managing one's time by doing things early in the day to avoid staying late and losing essential sleep time.
- Taking vitamin D and magnesium supplements that may help induce sleep.
- Reducing internet use.
- Practicing time management and priority-setting skills.
- Using a method called mental contrasting with implementation intentions (MCII) developed by Gabriele Oettingen.
