= Tirling pin =

Archaic Scottish alternative to a door-knocker

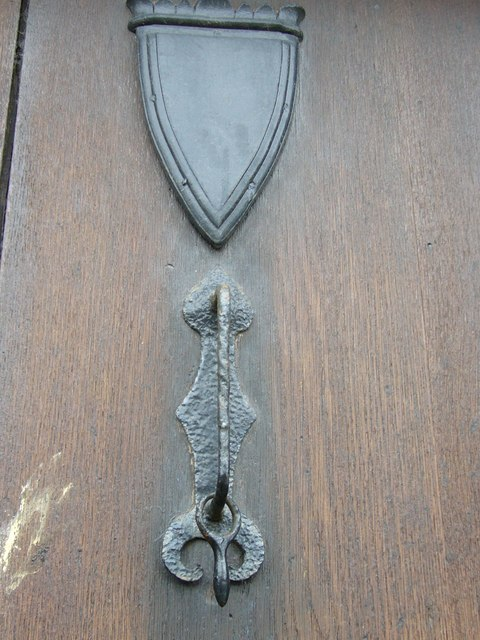
A tirling pin on a door in Edinburgh

A tirling pin or risp and ring (chiefly Scottish) is an archaic device that was used to announce a visitor's presence at a door, in lieu of a door-knocker. It consisted of a ring and a serrated rod, along which the ring could be rattled. A visitor using such a device was said to be "tirling the pin".

This sense was referred to by R. O. Heslop in his Northumberland Words (1894): "Doors were formerly provided with a long, notched, iron handle on which a loose iron ring was hung. Instead of rousing the house with a knock, the caller tirled the ring up and down the notches of the ‘tirling pin’, or handle".

Earlier uses of "tirling (at) the pin" may have been slightly different, however. The Oxford English Dictionary observes, the 'pin' of a door was the latch or handle to be turned or lifted to gain entrance, whereas a fixed serrated bar was known as a 'risp'. Thus, "to tirl at the pin" was to make a noise by moving the latch up and down rapidly. The OED speculates that the 'risp and ring' was a later device that erroneously became associated with the older action of ‘tirling at the pin’.

Brewer's Dictionary of Phrase and Fable (1898) is consistent with this, noting that "the pin is the door-latch, and before a visitor entered a room it was, in Scotland, thought good manners to fumble at the latch to give notice of your intention to enter".

== References in poetry ==
Lewis Carroll's poem "The Lang Coortin" published in Phantasmagoria and Other Poems (1869) has a comic reference:

Sadly, sadly he crossed the floor
And tirlëd at the pin:
Sadly went he through the door
Where sadly he cam' in.

The act of "tirling at the window" appears in the first verse of the original Scottish version of "Wee Willie Winkie" (1841).
