= Gabriele Oettingen =

German non-fiction writer, university teacher and psychologist

Princess Gabriele
- Born: 22 July 1953 (age 73); Munich, Germany
- Spouse: Peter Gollwitzer (m. 1990)
- Issue: Anton Gollwitzer; Jakob Gollwitzer
Names
- Gabriele Elisabeth Aloisia Notgera Prinzessin zu Oettingen-Oettingen und Oettingen-Spielberg
- House: Oettingen-Spielberg
- Father: Alois Philipp, 9th Prince of Oettingen-Oettingen and Oettingen-Spielberg
- Mother: Countess Elisabeth Gabriele zu Lynar
- Occupation: psychologist, professor

Princess Gabriele of Oettingen-Oettingen and Oettingen-Spielberg, known professionally as Gabriele Oettingen, (born Gabriele Elisabeth Aloisia Notgera Prinzessin zu Oettingen-Oettingen und Oettingen-Spielberg; July 22, 1953, in Munich) is a German academic and psychologist. She is a professor of psychology at New York University and the University of Hamburg. Her research focuses on how people think about the future, and how this impacts cognition, emotion, and behavior.

== Early life ==
Oettingen was born on July 22, 1953, in Munich, Germany to Alois Philipp Joseph Maria Notger, 9th Prince of Oettingen-Oettingen and Oettingen-Spielberg and Countess Elisabeth Gabriele zu Lynar. She is a member of the German princely House of Oettingen-Spielberg.

== Education and career ==
Oettingen studied biology in Munich and subsequently worked at the Max Planck Institute for Behavioral Physiology in Seewiesen, Germany, and at the Medical Research Council, Unit on the Development and Integration of Behaviour, Madingley, Cambridge, England. Simultaneously she did her PhD at LMU Munich. She was funded by the John D. and Catherine T. MacArthur Foundation to conduct research at the University of Pennsylvania, Philadelphia, US. She worked at the Max Planck Institute for Human Development in Berlin while also gaining a Dr. habil. degree in psychology at the Free University Berlin. She accepted a professor of psychology position at University of Hamburg in 2000, and since 2002 is a professor of psychology at New York University.

Oettingen has created various models of how people think about the future. She has investigated how cultural and political system factors influence optimistic thinking and behavior. She has distinguished between expectations of future success versus fantasies of future success and has found that these two forms of thinking about the future decisively differ in their impact on actual effort and success. Oettingen has developed fantasy realization theory (FRT), which is supported by her empirical evidence that mentally contrasting future and present reality most successfully evokes changes of cognition, emotion, and behavior, and that cognitive and motivational processes outside of awareness are responsible for these effects.

Based on a psychological principle called "mental contrasting" that involves mentally focusing on the contrast between the positive aspects of one's goals and the negative aspects of one's obstacles or current situation, Oettingen has created behavior change interventions, many of which integrate implementation intentions, a planning strategy suggested by Peter Gollwitzer. One such intervention is Mental Contrasting with Implementation Intentions (MCII), also known as WOOP (Wish, Outcome, Obstacle, Plan), a strategy that she claims people can use to find and fulfill their wishes and change their habits. Oettingen presents WOOP as a self-regulation tool meant to support people in effectively mastering their everyday life and long-term development, across domains such as career achievement, health, and interpersonal domains.

Oettingen's work is published in journals of social and personality psychology, developmental and educational psychology, in health and clinical psychology, in organizational and consumer psychology, as well as in neuropsychology and medical journals. Her research aims to contribute to the literature on lifestyle change, education, and business.

Oettingen's first trade book, Rethinking Positive Thinking, was published in October 2014. In 2015, James C. Coyne attacked Oettingen's book Rethinking Positive Thinking and accused her of aggressively promoting pseudoscience while ignoring other research in clinical psychology. Coyne pointed out that as part of Oettingen's aggressive promotional campaign for her book, her own son created Wikipedia articles about her work.

== Personal life ==
Oettingen lives and works in New York City and Munich. On August 10, 1990, she married Peter Gollwitzer. They had a religious ceremony on January 22, 1994. They have two children, Anton and Jakob.

== See also ==
- GROW model — a coaching model similar to Oettingen's WOOP model
