= Bedtime story =

Telling of a story to somebody, usually a child, about to sleep

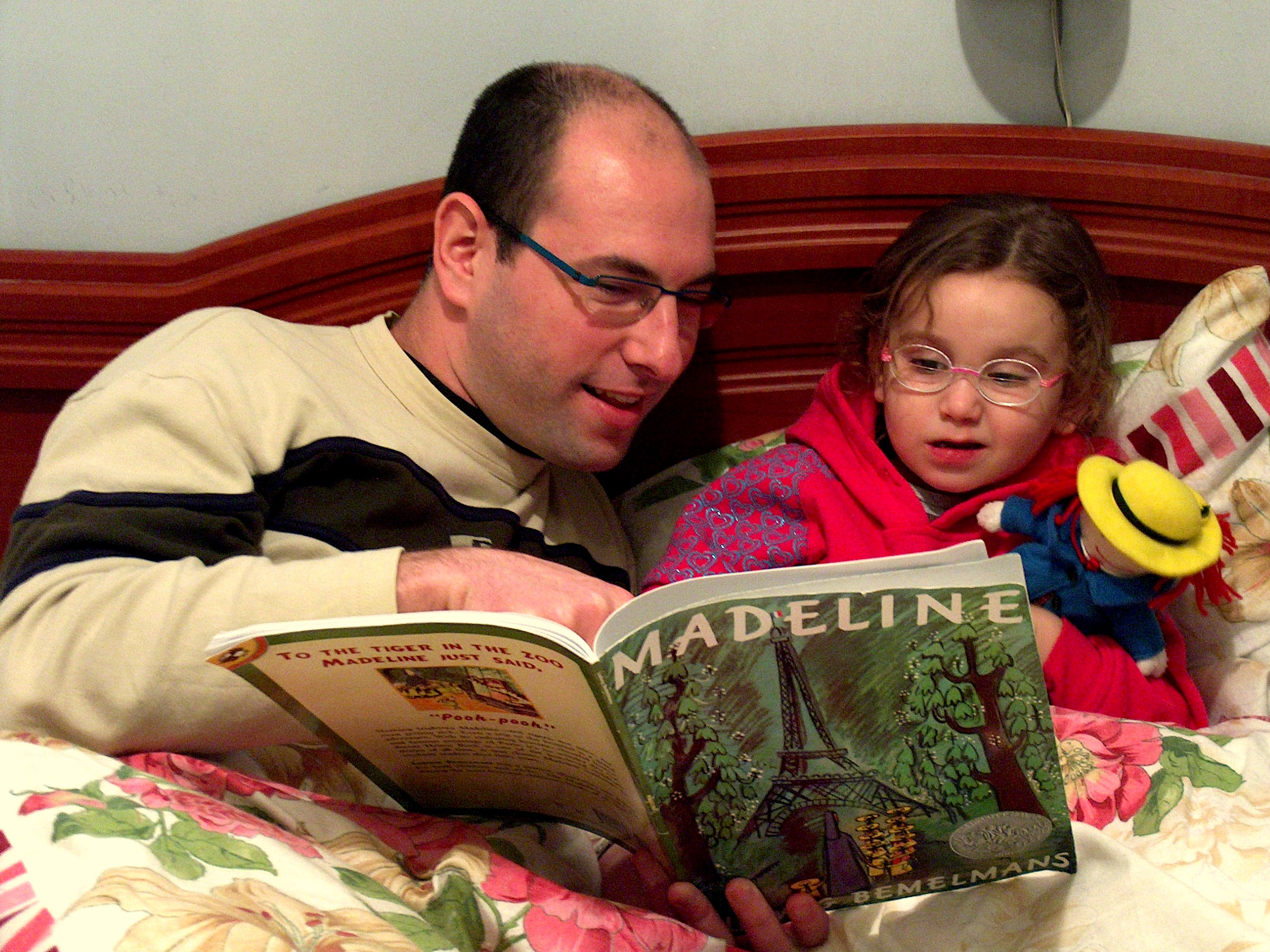
A father reading his daughter a bedtime story: Madeline by Ludwig Bemelmans

A bedtime story is a traditional form of storytelling, where a story is told to a person, usually a child, at bedtime to prepare them for sleep. The bedtime story has long been considered "a definite institution in many families".

== History ==
The term "bedtime story" was coined by Louise Chandler Moulton in her 1873 book, Bed-time Stories. The "ritual of an adult reading out loud to a child at bedtime formed mainly in the second half of the nineteenth century and achieved prominence in the early twentieth century in tandem with the rising belief that soothing rituals were necessary for children at the end of the day. The practice of reading bedtime stories contributed to the growth of the picture book industry, and may also have contributed to the practice of isolated sleeping for children.

== Western culture ==
Within the Western culture, many parents read bedtime stories to their kids to assist with falling asleep. Among other benefits, this ritual is considered to reinforce the parent-child relationship. The type of stories and the time at which they are read may differ on cultural basis.

Bedtime stories may be used to teach children abstract virtues such as sympathy, altruism, and self-control, and empathy by helping children to imagine the feelings of others. The stories can be used to discuss darker subjects such as death and racism.

=== Europe ===
A vast number of bedtime stories, now famous around the world, originated in Europe. The European culture of bedtime stories is inspired in part by Aesop's fables and Greek fables.

=== Aesop's fables ===
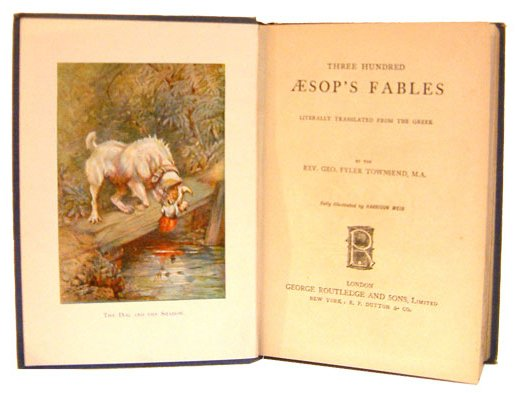
Aesop's fables are short stories, such as The Dog and Its Reflection, that children can understand.

Aesop's fables are a collection of fables that were written by a Greek storyteller named Aesop, who derived them from oral traditions of the Greek people. The fables were collected and compiled after his death, and have been translated into many modern languages. These fables include different animal characters, providing a moral lesson or great piece of wisdom for the young minds to understand. The many fables include,

- The Ant and the Grasshopper
- The Boy Who Cried Wolf
- The Cock, the Dog and the Fox
- The Dog and Its Reflection
- The Tortoise and the Hare

These fables may be used to teach children ethical and moral values. Books like Tenali Stories, Chimpak and others can also be considered as storybooks which not only entertains the kids but also helps kids inculcate moral values. They may be read as bedtime stories.

== Scientific research ==
The fixed routine of a bedtime story before sleeping can improve the child's brain development, language acquisition, and problem solving skills. The storyteller-listener relationship creates an emotional bond between the parent and the child. Due to "the strength of the imitative instinct" of a child, the parent and the stories that they tell act as a model for the child to follow. Being read bedtime stories increases children's vocabularies.
