= Max Planck Institute for Psychological Research =

German research institute

The Max Planck Institute for Psychological Research was a research institute of the Max Planck Society formerly located in Munich in Germany.

Founded in 1981, the institute included the following units:

- Behavioral and Cognitive Development (formerly Development Psychology) under the direction of Prof. Dr. Franz E. Weinert
- Motivational Psychology under the direction of Prof. Dr. Heinz Heckhausen
- Intention and Action under the direction of Dr. Peter Gollwitzer
- Cognition and Action under Prof. Dr. Wolfgang Prinz
- Adaptive Behavior and Cognition under Prof. Dr. Gerd Gigerenzer, which moved in 1997 to the Max Planck Institute for Human Development

In 2004, the Max Planck Institute for Psychological Research merged with the Max Planck Institute for Neuropsychological Research to become the Max Planck Institute for Human Cognitive and Brain Sciences in Leipzig, Germany. The Munich site of the institute was officially closed on September 30, 2006.
