= Cognitive Development =

Quarterly scientific journal

- Discipline: Cognitive psychology Developmental psychology
- Language: English
- Edited by: Christiane Lange-Küttner

Publication details
- History: 1986; 40 years ago to present
- Publisher: Elsevier
- Frequency: Quarterly
- Impact factor: 1.8 (2024)

Standard abbreviations
- ISO 4: Cogn. Dev.

Indexing
- ISSN: 0885-2014
- LCCN: 91660201
- OCLC no.: 643914329

Links
- Journal homepage; Online access; Online archive

Cognitive Development is a quarterly peer-reviewed scientific journal covering cognitive and developmental psychology. It was established in 1986 and is published by Elsevier. The editor-in-chief is Christiane Lange-Küttner (Bremen University). According to the Journal Citation Reports, the journal has a 2024 impact factor of 1.8 and a CiteScore of 3.6.
