= Bedtime =

Time of transition from wakefulness to sleep

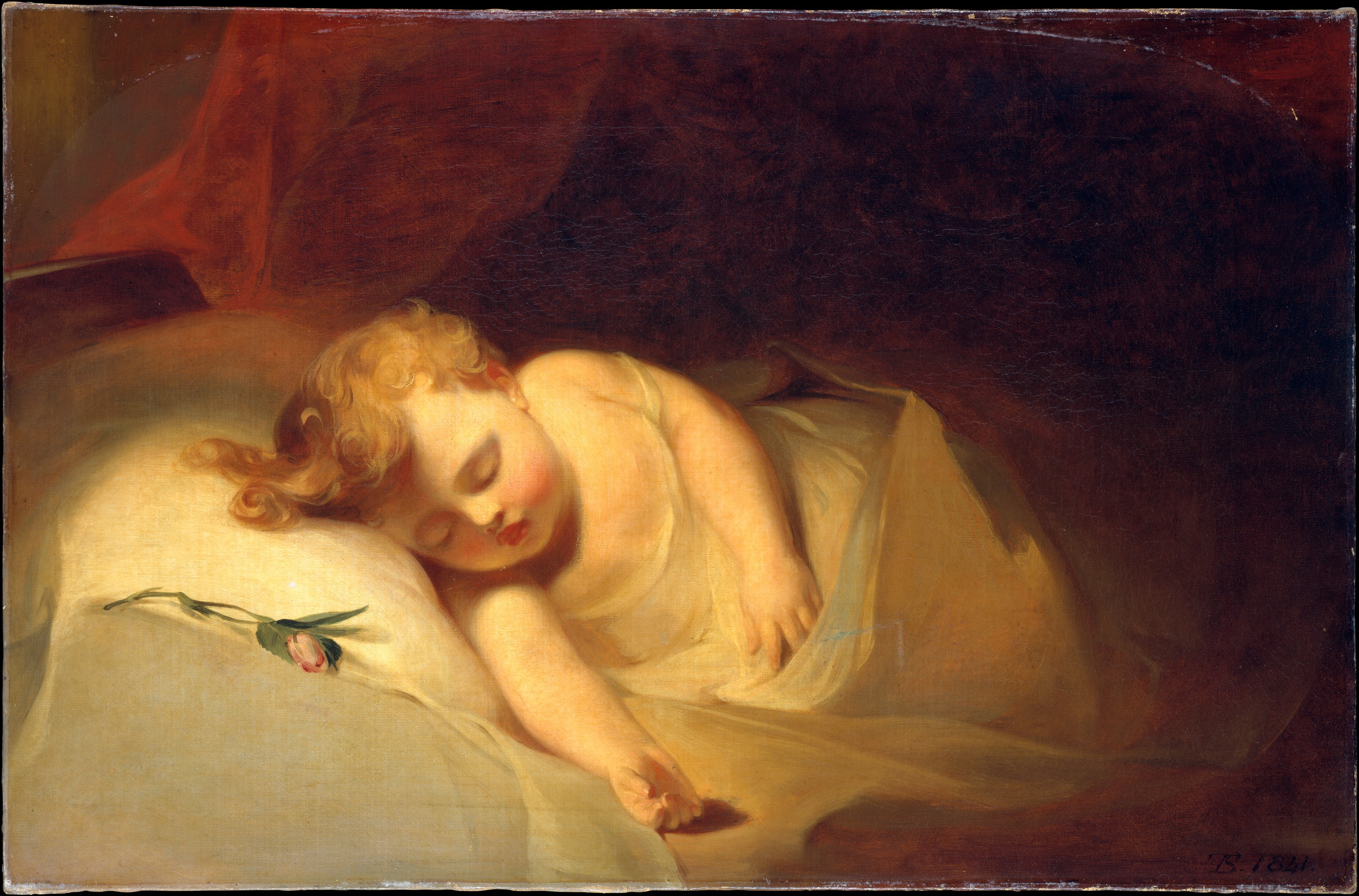
Child Asleep (The Rosebud) by Thomas Sully (1841)

Bedtime (also called putting to bed or tucking in) is a parenting ritual to help children feel more secure and become accustomed to a more rigid schedule of sleep than they might prefer. The ritual of bedtime is aimed at facilitating the transition from wakefulness to sleep. It may involve bedtime stories, children's songs, nursery rhymes, bed-making and getting children to change into nightwear. In some religious households, prayers are said shortly before going to bed. Sleep training may be part of the bedtime ritual for babies and toddlers.

In adult use, the term means simply "time for bed", similar to curfew, as in "It's past my bedtime". Some people are accustomed to drinking a nightcap or herbal tea at bedtime. Sleeping coaches are also used to help individuals reach their bedtime goals. Researchers studying sleep are finding patterns revealing that cell phone use at night disturbs going to sleep at one's bedtime and achieving a good night's sleep. In colloquial speech, the term simply means 'time to sleep', much like a curfew; for example, 'it's already late'.

== Synonyms ==
In boarding schools and on trips or holidays that involve young people, the equivalent of bedtime is lights out or lights-out - this term is also used in prisons, hospitals, in the military, and in sleep research.

== Newspapers ==
Print newspapers, usually a daily, was "put to bed" when editorial work on the issue had formally ceased, the content was fixed, and printing could begin.

== See also ==
- Crib talk
- Lullaby
- Sleep cycle
