= Peter Gollwitzer =

German professor of psychology

Peter Max Gollwitzer
- Born: 29 June 1950 (age 76); Nabburg, Germany
- Citizenship: German
- Education: University of Regensburg (B.A., 1973); Ruhr University Bochum (M.A., 1977); University of Texas at Austin (Ph.D., 1981); LMU Munich (Dr. habil., 1987)
- Occupation: Professor of Psychology
- Employer: New York University
- Known for: Goal-setting theory, Implementation intentions, Rubicon Model of Action Phases, Mindset Theory of Action Phases
- Spouse(s): Princess Gabriele of Oettingen-Oettingen and Oettingen-Spielberg
- Awards: Max Planck Research Award (1990); TransCoop Award (1994); Fellow of Academia Europaea; Fellow of American Psychological Association

Peter Max Gollwitzer (born 29 June 1950 in Nabburg) is a German professor of psychology in the Psychology Department at New York University (NYU). His research centers on how goals and plans affect cognition, emotion, and behavior.

Gollwitzer has developed several models of action control: the symbolic self-completion theory (with Robert A. Wicklund); the Rubicon Model of Action Phases (with Heinz Heckhausen); the Auto-Motive Model of Automatic Goal Striving (with John A. Bargh); the Mindset Theory of Action Phases (MAP); and the distinction between action control by Goal Intentions vs. Implementation Intentions (i.e., if-then plans).

Gollwitzer's experimental research based on these models delineates the various underlying psychological mechanisms of action control, and it distills the respective moderators. His recent research uses previous insights on action control by if-then planning to develop powerful time and cost-effective behavior change interventions; this work is rooted in the mental contrasting theory of goal pursuit as proposed by Gabriele Oettingen.

Prior to coming to NYU in 1999, Gollwitzer held the following positions: assistant professor in the Department of Psychology at Ruhr University Bochum, (1982-1983); junior researcher, Max Planck Institute for Psychological Research, Munich (1984-1988); and senior researcher, Max Planck Institute for Psychological Research (Coordinator of the Intention & Action Group), Munich (1989-1992). In 1993, he became the chair of the social psychology and motivation unit at the University of Konstanz, Germany.

Gollwitzer received his bachelor's degree from the University of Regensburg (1973), a master's degree from Ruhr University Bochum (1977), a Ph.D. from the University of Texas at Austin (1981), and a Dr. habil. degree from LMU Munich (1987).

Gollwitzer is a Fellow of Academia Europaea and of the American Psychological Association as well as a Charter Fellow of the American Psychological Society. He has won a Max Planck Research Award (1990) and a TransCoop Award (1994), which is given by the Alexander von Humboldt Foundation.

He is married to a fellow NYU professor, Princess Gabriele of Oettingen-Oettingen and Oettingen-Spielberg.
