= Implementation intention =

Strategy in psychology on attaining goals

An implementation intention is a self-regulatory strategy in the form of if-then-plans that can lead to better goal attainment, as well as create useful habits and modify problematic behaviors. It is subordinate to goal intentions as it specifies the when, where and how portions of goal-directed behavior.

In its most basic formulation, implementation intentions address everyday situations where a person could respond more effectively and more sustainably towards a goal (e.g. improving a personal relationship), and the technique acknowledges the fact that most have no troubles defining concrete and attainable goals as well as plans, but often have trouble identifying a situation where an action would be very effective for attaining the goal.

Though if-then-plans create habits, the key difference is that the technique creates habits consciously. Each if-then-plan creates a new habit which, in turn, improves the user's life in one or several aspects.

The concept of implementation intentions was introduced in 1999 by psychologist Peter Gollwitzer. Studies conducted by Gollwitzer in 1997 and earlier show that the use of implementation intentions can result in a higher probability of successful goal attainment, by predetermining a specific and desired goal-directed behavior in response to a particular future event or cue.

== History ==
The concept of implementation intentions originated from research on goal striving throughout the late 1980s and 1990s. Developing research suggests that "the correlations between intentions and behavior are modest, in that intentions account for only 20% to 30% of the variance in behavior." Strong intentions ("I strongly intend to do X") were observed to be more often realized than weak intentions. Past behavior still tended to be a better predictor for a person's future behavior when it was compared to goal intentions. The research also suggested that the weak intention-behavior relation is a result of people having good intentions, but failing to act on them.

This inspired a growing body of research to help determine ways in which peoples' good intentions could be made more effective in accomplishing desired goals. Emerging research proposed the notion that successful goal attainment is in part attributable to the manner in which goal setting criteria are framed. For example, a person will perform better when set goals are challenging and specific as compared to goals that are challenging but vague (known as the goal-specificity effect). Emerging research also suggested a goal-proximity effect (wherein proximal goals lead to better performance than distal goals). The strategy of implementation intentions was developed on the basis of these findings.

== Concept ==
People generally have positive intentions, but often fail to act on them. The question is how to ensure that the set goal intentions will reliably lead to the desired goal-directed behaviors, and subsequent attainment of those goals. Implementation intentions offer a practical solution for such a problem.

Achieving one's goals requires that certain goal-directed behaviors be instituted, but people are often unsuccessful in either initiating or maintaining these behaviors. The problems of initiating and maintaining goal-directed behavior can be addressed by using the implementation intention process. This if-then plan is a very specific approach as compared to goal intentions. A goal intention may be phrased in the following way: "I want to reach X!" Implementation intentions on the other hand are much more specific and seek to connect a future critical situation (an opportunity for goal attainment) with a specific goal-directed behavior, thereby leading to what could be called automatization in goal attainment. They are often phrased in the following way: "When situation X arises, I will perform response Y!" Where goal intentions are more general and abstract, implementation intentions are much more concrete and procedural.

Having formed a concrete plan involving a specific situation, this situation then becomes mentally represented and activated, leading to better perception, attention and memory concerning the critical situation. As a result, the chosen goal-directed behavior (the then-part of the plan) will be performed automatically and efficiently, without conscious effort. The automatization of the behavior in response to the future situation or cue, removes all hesitation and deliberation on the part of the decision maker when such a critical situation arises. This also has the effect of freeing cognitive resources for other mental processing tasks, and also for avoiding goal-threatening distractions or competing goals. It is also assumed that an implementation intention, once set, will continue operating non-consciously. This process is called strategic automaticity.

The strength of commitment related to both the plan set and the goal is very important for the implementation intention to have an effect on people's behavior. Without commitment, an implementation intention will hardly have any effect on goal-directed behavior.

In the phase model of action, the use of implementation intention takes place in the post-decisional phase (implemental mindset, volition is the driving force of action) which follows the predecisional phase (deliberative mindset, motivation is the driving force of setting goals). In the implemental mindset, a person is already committed to a goal and an implementation intention can be a good strategy to reach this goal.

=== In practice ===
Usually, the user first collects a list of issues that can be addressed with minor but rather frequent actions. Some examples:

The person comes home, and starts watching TV until tired enough to sleep. As a result, household chores get postponed to the weekend, when they are done with palpable disdain.

A solution could be:

IF I get home before 19:00, THEN I will immediately clean up my room for 15 minutes.

I get tired in the early afternoon. I spend my noon break at the desk and I could use some more physical activity.

IF it is 12:30 THEN I will walk to the nearest shop to buy a snack.

The then-sentence is applied strictly whenever the if-clause is fulfilled, without any exception. If the user has to deliberate on whether an exception is justified, it adds to his cognitive burden, and thus can be detrimental for attaining the goals.

The if-then-plans can be revised after some time. This occurs, for example, when changes in the subject's everyday life have reduced the amount of if-situations that provoke a then-reaction. Then, new plans can be drawn up.

As the intention of the technique is to direct the user to clearly defined and short actions that improve his situation in the long run, and to reduce the burden of decision-making, the then clause should never mention a goal, or the problematic behavior itself.

== Theory ==
Actively prompting individuals to make plans increases their likelihood of following through. Effective planning prompts guide people to consider when, where, and how they can act upon their intentions. Facilitating plan creation helps to increase follow-through for several reasons. First, it helps people to consider logistic obstacles and develop specific tactics to navigate around them. Second, the process helps to reduce the likelihood that someone will underestimate the time required by a task. Third, plan creation helps people to remember to act. Lastly, the formation of an action plan serves as a commitment to act. Research shows that breaking commitments generates discomfort. As such, plans are particularly effective when they are made as commitments to another person.

Todd Rogers, Katherine L. Milkman, Leslie K. John, and Michael I. Norton (2015) suggest the following situations in which the use of planning prompts is most effective:

- When strong intentions already exist
- When these intentions are intrinsically motivated
- When at least some obstacles exist
- When no current plan exists
- When the risk of forgetting to act is high
- When the timeline for action is finite
- When planning will induce people to consider specific barriers to action
- When there is a specific future time for action
- When people can think specifically about implementation details
- When there are opportunities to share plans publicly
- When planning for single rather than multiple goals
- When there is a low likelihood that unanticipated moments for action will arise

== Empirical support ==
Implementation intentions have been very successful in helping individuals achieve targeted and specific goals over the years, as indicated by a survey of the research.

=== Voting plans ===
Implementation intentions can help to increase voter turnout. A study by David W. Nickerson and Todd Rogers (2010) found that voters in a high-salience election were more likely to vote when they received an implementation intentions phone call facilitating the creation of a voting plan. Voters who were contacted with an implementation intentions phone script were asked three questions to facilitate plan-making: what time they would vote, where they would be going to the voting place from, and what they would be doing immediately prior to voting. Voters who were contacted via this phone script were 4.1 percentage points more likely to vote than those who did not receive a call.

=== Flu shots ===
Planning prompts can also increase the likelihood that individuals will get flu shots. In a study conducted by Katherine L. Milkman, John Beshears, James J. Choi, David Laibson, and Brigitte C. Madrian (2011), randomly assigned employees at a Midwestern company received a mailing that prompted them to write down the date and time that they would get their flu shot, while the remaining employees received a letter with only the clinic information. Those who received the plan-making letter were 4 percentage points more likely to get a flu shot.

=== Physical health goals ===
Implementation intentions have been found to be particularly effective in unpleasant goal pursuits such as health-promotion (e.g. balanced and nutritious diet) and disease-prevention (e.g. daily exercise) behaviors, where there may be significant immediate costs and only long-term rewards. Of women who set themselves the goal of performing a breast self-examination over the next month, 100% actually did so if they were induced to form an implementation intention, compared to 53% of women who were not induced to form an implementation intention.

In a 2-month study investigating the effect of implementation intentions on weight loss, obese women between the ages of 18 and 76 were either instructed to create specific implementation intentions regarding their dieting and exercise (e.g. when, where, and what I will eat during the upcoming week; Where, when, how will I exercise during the upcoming week), or simply attend health, diet and stress-related group meetings. The women who were asked to create specific implementation intentions lost on average 4.2 kg, compared to those who only attended weekly group meetings, who on average lost only 2.1 kg over the 2-month period.

In another example, a study sought to increase the consumption of fruits and vegetables in a young-adult population. Participants who created "if-then" implementation intentions significantly increased reported fruit and vegetable intake by half a portion per day (over the course of one week), as compared to participants who made more global and less specific implementation intentions, who consumed about 0.31 more portions per day.

=== Emotion regulation ===
In 2009 Schweiger Gallo, Keil, Gollwitzer, Rockstroh and McCulloch published another study that was conducted to address the effectiveness of implementation intentions in regulating emotional reactivity.

The two studies required that disgust (in Study 1) and fear (in Study 2) eliciting stimuli were viewed by participants subject to three different self-regulation instructions:

1. The first group was given the simple goal intention to not experience fright or disgust, and was told to believe "I will not get frightened."
2. The second group was given the first goal intention, with an additional implementation intention, and was told to believe "And if I see a spider, I will stay calm and relaxed."
3. The third group was given no-self-regulation as the control group and did not receive any instruction prior to the event.

Disgust was selected because it is almost universally considered to be a basic emotion in the applicable literature. Fear was selected because anxiety disorders, such as panic disorders or phobias are common, and they affect the life of many people. The participants reported on the intensity of the elicited emotions by rating experienced arousal. Only group two, the implementation intention participants, succeeded in reducing their disgust and fear reactions compared to the other two groups.

These results support the idea that self-regulation by using simple goal intentions can run into problems when immediate and strong emotional reactivity has to be down-regulated, whereas implementation intentions appear to be an effective tool for self-regulation.

Implementation intentions inhibit the automatic activation of stereotypical beliefs and prejudicial feelings. In a more recent study, the use of implementation intentions was applied to interactions with new acquaintances as well as interracial interactions. The notion is that interactions with new acquaintances can be laden with anxiety and also decrease interest and desire for long-term contact. The study found that implementation intentions actually increased interest in sustained contact during anxiety provoking interactions and also led to closer interpersonal distance in anticipation of interracial interactions. The results also suggest that anxiety itself was not reduced by means of implementation intentions, but rather, implementation intentions shielded individuals from the negative effects of anxiety during social interactions.

== Mechanism ==
The earlier developments of the concept suggest that implementation intentions cause the mental representation of the anticipated situation to become highly activated and therefore easily accessible. The stronger the relationship between the cue or future situation and the predetermined behavior or response, the greater the success of initiating the desired goal-directed behavior. Since all components of the future behavior are predetermined (e.g. the when, where, and how), the association and relationship between said cue and behavior become automatic over time. That is, action initiation becomes immediate, efficient, and does not require conscious intent. In a more condensed explanation, implementation intentions automate action initiation.

More contemporary developments of the concept look not only at the initiatory aspects of implementation intentions, but look also at the longer-term phenomenon of behavior maintenance as it related to implementation intentions. The research suggests that implementation intentions result not only in an association between cue and behavior, but it's the act of planning into the future that actually serves as the foundation for this phenomenon. An experiment conducted by Papies et al., investigated the rate of goal completion by means of both implementation intentions and also the learning of cue-behavior association. Initially, both approaches led to the same rate of goal completion, but a week later, only the effect of implementation intentions was maintained. This lends evidence to the notion that implementation intentions rely on more complex mechanisms than simple cue-behavior associations, as was believed to be the case in earlier research.

== Implementation Intentions and Goal Shielding ==
A large amount of research has been conducted on implementation intentions to better understand the questions relating to the initiation of goal striving. Unfortunately, the prior study of shielding of ongoing goal striving has been neglected in that research.

One study regarding this question was reported by Achtziger, Gollwitzer and Sheeran . It was shown in that study that implementation intentions can even assist people to shield goal striving from unwanted thoughts and feelings, such as cravings for junk food and from distracting thoughts. Two field experiments, concerning dieting (Study 1) and performance in sports (Study 2), have shown that there was a significant positive influence of implementation intentions on protecting ongoing goal striving. Participants who formed implementation intentions were more successful with long-term dieting, as well as concentration and performance in a tennis match. The focus on "If-then-plans" is the prevention of distracting thoughts and an efficient accomplishment of cognitive, motivational and emotional barriers of goal striving.

As these studies were run in "everyday" situations outside of an artificial laboratory, they possess a high external validity, and thus display the importance and meaningfulness of implementation intentions for everyday life.

== Limitations ==
As reported by Theodore A. Powers and colleagues, implementation intentions seem to have a negative effect on the performance in people who score high on socially prescribed perfectionism.
