= Viorica Marian =

Moldovan-born American psycholinguist, cognitive scientist and psychologist

Viorica Marian is a Moldovan-born American psycholinguist, cognitive scientist, and psychologist known for her research on bilingualism and multilingualism. She is the Ralph and Jean Sundin Endowed Professor of Communication Sciences and Disorders, and professor of psychology at Northwestern University. Marian is the principal investigator of the Bilingualism and Psycholinguistics Research Group. She received her PhD in psychology from Cornell University, and master's degrees from Emory University and from Cornell University. Marian studies language, cognition, the brain, and the consequences of knowing more than one language for linguistic, cognitive, and neural architectures.

== Biography ==
Viorica Marian was born in Chișinău, Moldova, in a family of public health physicians. Her mother was an epidemiologist and her father taught at the medical university; her brother is a lawyer in Stockholm, Sweden. Marian grew up speaking Romanian and Russian and studied English in school. She first came to the United States as part of a high school delegation, returning a year later to attend college. She received a bachelor's degree in psychology from the University of Alaska Anchorage, a master's degree in cognitive and developmental psychology from Emory University, and a PhD and second master's degree in human experimental psychology from Cornell University. Viorica Marian was the last graduate student and mentee of American psychologist Ulric Neisser, widely regarded as the “Father of Cognitive Psychology.” Since 2000, Marian has been a professor at Northwestern University, where she currently holds the Ralph and Jean Sundin Endowed Chair in Communication Sciences and Disorders. Marian served as department chair of Northwestern University's department of communication sciences and disorders between 2011-2014 and as chair of the National Institutes of Health Study Section on Language and Communication between 2020 and 2022.

Marian is a recipient of the American Association for the Advancement of Science John P. McGovern Award, the Psychonomic Society Mid-Career Award, the Clarence Simon Award for Outstanding Teaching and Mentoring, the University of Alaska Alumni of Achievement Award, and the Editor's Award for best paper from the Journal of Speech, Language, and Hearing Research, and is an elected fellow of the American Association for the Advancement of Science and the Psychonomic Society.

Marian was trained in eye-tracking by Michael Spivey, and in functional neuroimaging by Joy Hirsch, and was also influenced by Stephen Ceci, Urie Bronfenbrenner, Frank Keil, Joan Sereno, Daryl Bem, David Field, Carol Krumhansl, Thomas Gilovich, Shimon Edelman, and James Cutting while at Cornell. At Emory, she was influenced by psychologists Philippe Rochat, Robyn Fivush, Eugene Winograd, Carolyn Mervis, John Pani, Michael Tomasello, Frans de Waal, and others. At the University of Alaska, Marian studied with Alaska's only cognitive psychologist at the time, Dr. Robert Madigan.

== Research and contributions to science ==
Viorica Marian's research areas include Psycholinguistics, Neurolinguistics, Cognitive Science, Language and Cognition, Linguistic and Cultural Diversity, Communication Sciences and Disorders, Bilingualism, and Multilingualism. She studies language processing, language and memory, language learning, language development, audio-visual integration, bilingual assessment, neurolinguistics of bilingualism, and computational models of bilingual language processing. Marian uses multiple approaches, including eye-tracking, EEG, fMRI, mouse-tracking, computational modeling, and cognitive tests to understand how bilingualism and multilingualism change human function. Funding for her research comes from the National Institutes of Health, the National Science Foundation, private foundations, and Northwestern University.

Parallel activation of both languages in bilinguals.

Marian's research revealed that bilinguals activate both languages in parallel during spoken language comprehension. The traditional account of bilingual spoken language processing was the Language Switch Hypothesis, which posited that bilinguals turn off the non-target language during target language processing. Using eye-tracking, Marian demonstrated that bilinguals do not turn off the non-target language, and instead process the two languages in parallel and co-activate words from both languages as speech unfolds. For example, she showed that when Russian-English bilinguals were asked to pick up a marker, they also made eye movements to a stamp, because the Russian word for stamp (marka) shared phonological form with the target English word and became co-activated. This research showed, for the first time, that, as words unfold, phonological input gets mapped onto both of a bilingual's languages. Marian has since extended these findings to Spanish-English, German-English and even ASL-English bilinguals, the latter showing that co-activation of two languages can take place across modalities and relies not only on bottom-up, but also on top-down and lateral processes. This work yields strong support for a dynamic bilingual language system that accommodates a high degree of interactivity between and within languages. Co-activation of two languages has since been replicated in many laboratories around the world and as a result of this work, the view that bilinguals co-activate both languages in parallel during comprehension has become widely accepted among language scientists.

Language-dependent memory.

Marian's contribution to the study of language and memory focused on the effects of language on cognitive processes in bilinguals. Building on the encoding specificity principle, Marian demonstrated that the language one speaks influences memory retrieval, a hypothesis that has since become known as Language-Dependent Memory. Psychologists have studied context-dependent memory in a number of domains, including environmental-context dependent memory, mood-dependent memory, and mental reinstatement of context. Marian showed that linguistic context can lead to similar effects and that memories became more accessible when the language at retrieval matched the language at encoding. For example, she found that bilinguals who learned a second language later in life were more likely to remember events that happened in their childhood when speaking their first language and more likely to remember events that happened later in life when speaking their second language. Similarly, her research revealed that bilinguals answered questions about everyday facts and information differently in their two languages depending on the language in which that information was learned; and that they differed in self-construal and emotion across languages. This work contributed to understanding how multiple cognitive perspectives and mental models co-exist within one mind and the role language may play in mediating these processes.

Language learning.

Marian's research has contributed to demonstrating a bilingual advantage in novel language learning. She and her students showed that bilinguals outperform monolinguals at learning a new language and used eye tracking and mouse tracking trajectories to demonstrate that bilinguals were better at controlling interference from the native language when using a newly learned language.

Cognitive consequences of bilingualism.

A prominent discovery in the field of bilingualism is that bilingualism may change performance on certain cognitive control tasks. This work has provided a framework for studying cognitive repercussions of being bilingual. Marian and her students contributed to this area by showing a link between lexical co-activation in spoken comprehension, subsequent linguistic inhibition, and non-linguistic inhibitory control in bilinguals. Her research group also demonstrated that the impact of bilingualism is not limited to language processing, but also influences visual search and changes how speakers of different languages focus their attention. For example, English and Spanish speakers look at different objects when searching for the same item (e.g., clock) in identical visual displays. Whereas English speakers searching for the clock also look at a cloud, Spanish-English bilinguals searching for the clock look at both a cloud and a gift, because the Spanish names for gift (regalo) and clock (reloj) overlap phonologically. These differences in looking patterns emerge despite an absence of direct linguistic input, suggesting that peoples’ lifelong experience with language can influence visual search.

Neurological consequences of bilingualism.

Marian's neuroimaging work examined overlap and differences in language networks across bilinguals’ two languages during language processing. She and her colleagues showed that bilingual experience changes neural organization and function.

Language research tools.

Marian's lab has developed various research tools that are widely used by the language science community and are freely available from Marian's Bilingualism and Psycholinguistics Research Group website. The Language Experience and Proficiency Questionnaire has been translated into over thirty languages and used in over a thousand studies worldwide; the Cross-Linguistics Easy-Access Resource for Phonological and Orthographic Neighborhood Densities database is currently the most extensive multilingual database of lexical neighborhoods available online; and the Bilingual Language Interaction Network for Comprehension of Speech provides the only existing dynamic self-organizing computational model of bilingual spoken language comprehension.

== The Power of Language ==
The Power of Language: How the Codes We Use to Think, Speak, and Live Transform Our Minds is a popular science book about language and the mind and multilingualism written by Northwestern University professor Viorica Marian and published by Penguin Random House in the U.S. and Canada in 2023, ISBN 9780593187074. Foreign editions of the book include:

- Arabic edition (Arab World and the Middle East): All Prints Distributors and Publishers S.A.L.
- Chinese-simplified edition (China): Dook Media Group, Shanghai. ISBN 978-7-5496-4097-3.
- Chinese-traditional edition (Taiwan): Morning Star Publishing, Taichung. ISBN 978-626-320-678-6.
- Commonwealth edition (includes UK, Australia, New Zealand): The Power of Language: Multilingualism, Self, and Society. London: Penguin Books. ISBN 978-0-241-62601-6.
- Dutch edition (Netherlands): Meertalig. (Multilingualism). Amsterdam: Ambo Anthos Uitgevers. ISBN 9789026362538.
- Japanese edition (Japan): Kodokawa Corporation. ISBN 9784046063779.
- Korean edition (South Korea): Wisdomhouse Publishing, Seoul. ISBN 9791175910379.
- Polish edition (Poland): Uniwersytet Jagiellonski - Wydawnictwo Uniwersytetu, Krakow. ISBN 978-83-233-5501-4.
- Portuguese edition (Brazil, also exclusive rights in Angola and Mozambique): Citadel Grupo Editorial.
- Romanian edition (Romania): Humanitas, Bucharest. ISBN 978-973-50-8587-2.
- Thai edition (Thailand): Bookscape Publishing House, Bangkok. ISBN 978-616-83-5512-1.
- Ukrainian edition (Ukraine): Vivat Publishing, Kharkiv, Ukraine. ISBN 9786171705098.

== Other ==
Marian graduated from college and started her PhD studies at the age of 19.

In 2008, she was featured in a Get-Out-the-Vote episode of the Oprah Winfrey Show.

In 2018, one of her tweets went viral and was viewed by over thirty million people across platforms: "I once taught an 8 am college class. So many grandparents died that semester. I then moved my class to 3 pm. No more deaths. And that, my friends, is how I save lives."

In 1996, she worked as interpreter and envoy during the Olympic Games in Atlanta.

== Lists of published Work ==
- https://scholar.google.com/citations?hl=en&user=CGY3UYIAAAAJ
- http://www.bilingualism.northwestern.edu/publications/
- https://www.researchgate.net/profile/Viorica_Marian
