= Unethical amnesia =

Tendency to forget the dishonest actions we committed

Unethical amnesia is the tendency to forget, or recall less vividly, one's own dishonest actions compared to other types of memories. This form of motivated forgetting is believed to help preserve an individual's positive self-image after engaging in unethical behavior. Research suggests that immoral actions create a psychological tension: while such events are often emotionally salient and therefore typically vivid, they also evoke discomfort such as guilt and shame, threatening one’s self-concept. As a result, it has been suggested that individuals may engage in self-protective processes that reduce the clarity or accessibility of such memories, thereby helping to preserve a coherent moral self-concept.

== Theoretical explanations ==
One influential explanation draws on the theory of cognitive dissonance, which refers to the discomfort experienced when an individual’s actions conflict with their beliefs. Most individuals are thought to hold a positive moral self-concept, viewing themselves as generally honest and ethical. When someone commits an unethical act, this self-image is threatened. Leon Festinger proposed that this state is psychologically aversive, motivating individuals to resolve the conflict, often by adjusting beliefs rather than behavior.

Research into reconstructive memory, including work by Frederic Bartlett and Elizabeth Loftus, has established that memory is not a perfect recording of events but a reconstructive process shaped by existing beliefs and expectations. Individuals are thought to hold self-schemas—mental frameworks of themselves as moral, against which memories are unconsciously filtered. When a transgression conflicts with this schema, the memory may be subtly reshaped to reduce the inconsistency. The distortion of such memories has been interpreted as serving a self-protective function, reducing psychological tension by making morally troubling acts less accessible to conscious recall.

Similarly, Albert Bandura identified a related mechanism known as moral disengagement, which allows individuals to act unethically without experiencing self-censure. By temporarily overriding internalized moral standards, people can engage in unethical behavior while maintaining a positive self-image. This can occur through mechanisms such as moral justification—reframing harmful acts as serving a greater good—or by downplaying personal responsibility for the consequences of one’s actions.

== Empirical evidence ==
Initial experimental investigations into unethical amnesia established that dishonest behavior is associated with reduced memory clarity for the act itself. In a large-scale set of behavioral experiments involving over 2,100 participants, Kouchaki and Gino found that individuals who engaged in dishonest behavior (e.g., misreporting die-roll outcomes for financial gain) subsequently reported weaker and less detailed recall of the unethical event, compared to those who behaved honestly. Reduced memory clarity was also predictive of future behavior, with poorer recall associated with an increased likelihood of repeated dishonesty.

Subsequent research examined the functional role of this memory attenuation. Galeotti and colleagues report that forgetting is not uniform, but is more pronounced when it serves an instrumental purpose, particularly reducing psychological barriers to future misconduct. This evidence suggests that unethical amnesia may act as a form of motivated memory regulation, potentially facilitating repeated unethical behavior.

Further empirical work explored how dishonest behavior affects both memory and metacognitive evaluation. This research found that dishonesty is associated with distortions in memory as well as reduced confidence in the accuracy of recalled events. These findings suggest that unethical amnesia may not only involve diminished recall, but also biased evaluation of one’s own memory, potentially contributing to the reduced psychological impact of past unethical actions through diminished emotional and moral weight.

== Functional and real-world implications ==
Unethical amnesia has significant implications for the persistence and escalation of dishonest behavior across social and institutional contexts. Reduced recall of past transgressions may limit opportunities for moral reflection, increasing the likelihood that minor unethical actions develop into more serious misconduct over time.

From an evolutionary perspective, such memory distortions may be interpreted as a form of adaptive self-deception. Robert Trivers proposed that self-deception involves the conscious distortion of reality and may have evolved because it enhances an individual’s ability to deceive others. By internalizing revised accounts of past unethical behavior, individuals may reduce behavioral cues associated with dishonesty and appear more credible in social interactions. Unethical amnesia may serve both self-protective and socially functional roles, maintaining a positive moral self-concept while supporting interpersonal trust.

This pattern of self-serving recall is also observed in interpersonal relationships. Baumeister and colleagues found that perpetrators tend to describe their harmful actions as isolated and understandable with limited consequences even though the victims perceive the same actions as unjustified and impactful. This asymmetry in recall and interpretation suggests that unethical amnesia may contribute to recurring conflict, as individuals underestimate the significance and consequences of their own behavior.

== Replication and methodological critique ==
While unethical amnesia has received empirical support, its robustness has been directly challenged by replication attempts. Stanley and colleagues conducted a series of studies that failed to replicate evidence that unethical behavior impairs memory accuracy. Their findings indicate that any observed effects may be limited to the subjective experience of remembering, such as vividness or clarity, rather than objective recall accuracy. This distinction raises questions about whether unethical amnesia reflects a genuine impairment of memory or simply a change in how memories are reported.

Methodological concerns have also been raised regarding the ecological validity of experimental paradigms used in early research. Laboratory settings often involve overt participant scrutiny, which may exaggerate prosocial responses compared to real-world contexts. Levitt and List demonstrated that behavior observed in controlled experiments can differ substantially from behavior in field settings, particularly when anonymity and reputational consequences vary. This limits the generalizability of laboratory findings to naturally occurring unethical behavior.

Individual differences in moral identity may further moderate this effect. Aquino and Reed's research on moral identity proposes that unethical amnesia may be less pronounced in individuals for whom morality is not central to their self-concept, since lower cognitive dissonance may weaken the motivation for memory distortion. These findings suggest that unethical amnesia may not be a universal phenomenon, but contingent on both situational and dispositional factors.
