= Forgetting =

Loss or modification of information encoded in an individual's memory

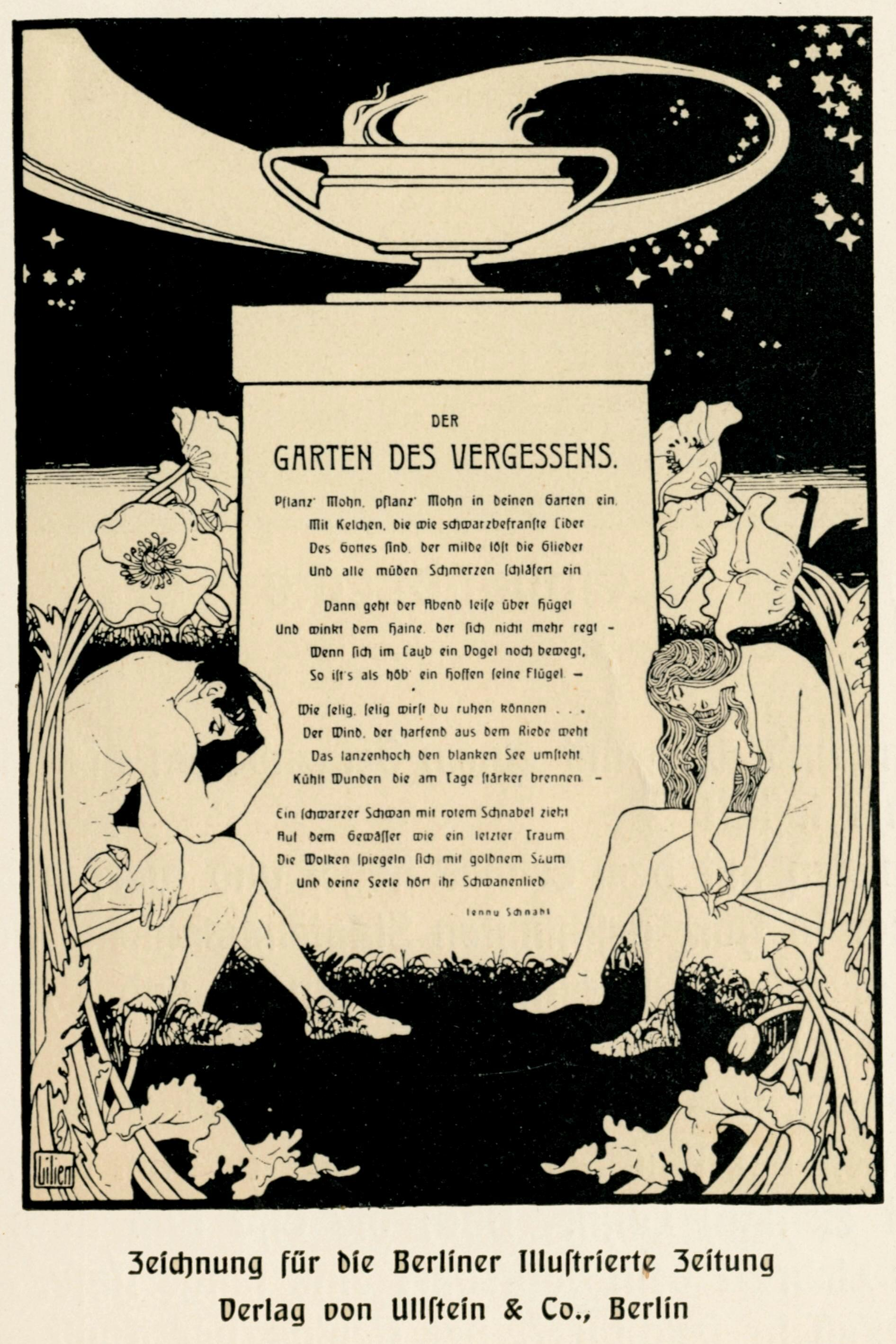
- The garden of oblivion, illustration for by Ephraim Moses Lilr the I
- Symptoms: Difficulty in remembering recent events, problems with language, disorientation, mood swings
- Complications: Dementia

Forgetting or disremembering is the apparent loss or modification of information already encoded and stored in an individual's short or long-term memory. It is a spontaneous or gradual process in which old memories are unable to be recalled from memory storage. Problems with remembering, learning and retaining new information are some of the most common complaints of older adults. Studies show that retention improves with increased rehearsal. This improvement occurs because rehearsal helps to transfer information into long-term memory.

Forgetting curves (amount remembered as a function of time since an event was first experienced) have been extensively analyzed. The most recent evidence suggests that a power function provides the closest mathematical fit to the forgetting function.

== Overview ==
Failing to retrieve an event does not mean that this specific event has been forever forgotten. Research has shown that there are a few health behaviors that to some extent can prevent forgetting from happening so often. One of the simplest ways to keep the brain healthy and prevent forgetting is to stay active and exercise. Staying active is important because overall it keeps the body healthy. When the body is healthy the brain is healthy and less inflamed as well. Older adults who were more active were found to have had less episodes of forgetting compared to those older adults who were less active. A healthy diet can also contribute to a healthier brain and aging process which in turn results in less frequent forgetting.

== History ==
One of the first to study the mechanisms of forgetting was the German psychologist Hermann Ebbinghaus (1885). Using himself as the sole subject in his experiment, he memorized lists of three letter nonsense syllable words—two consonants and one vowel in the middle. He then measured his own capacity to relearn a given list of words after a variety of given time period. He found that forgetting occurs in a systematic manner, beginning rapidly and then leveling off. Although his methods were primitive, his basic premises have held true today and have been reaffirmed by more methodologically sound methods. The Ebbinghaus forgetting curve is the name of his results which he plotted out and made 2 conclusions. The first being that much of what we forget is lost soon after it is originally learned. The second being that the amount of forgetting eventually levels off.

Around the same time Ebbinghaus developed the forgetting curve, psychologist Sigmund Freud theorized that people intentionally forgot things in order to push bad thoughts and feelings deep into their unconscious, a process he called "repression". There is debate as to whether (or how often) memory repression really occurs and mainstream psychology holds that true memory repression occurs only very rarely.

One process model for memory was proposed by Richard Atkinson and Richard Shiffrin in the 1960s as a way to explain the operation of memory. This modal model of memory, also known as the Atkinson-Shiffrin model of memory, suggests there are three types of memory: sensory memory, short-term memory, and long-term memory. Each type of memory is separate in its capacity and duration. In the modal model, how quickly information is forgotten is related to the type of memory where that information is stored. Information in the first stage, sensory memory, is forgotten after only a few seconds. In the second stage, short-term memory, information is forgotten after about 20 years. While information in long-term memory can be remembered for minutes or even decades, it may be forgotten when the retrieval processes for that information fail.

Concerning unwanted memories, modern terminology divides motivated forgetting into unconscious repression (which is disputed) and conscious thought suppression.

== Measurements ==
Forgetting can be measured in different ways all of which are based on recall:

=== Recall ===
For this type of measurement, a participant has to identify material that was previously learned. The participant is asked to remember a list of material. Later on they are shown the same list of material with additional information and they are asked to identify the material that was on the original list. The more they recognize, the less information is forgotten.

==== Free recall and variants ====
Free recall is a basic paradigm used to study human memory. In a free recall task, a subject is presented a list of to-be-remembered items, one at a time. For example, an experimenter might read a list of 20 words aloud, presenting a new word to the subject every 4 seconds. At the end of the presentation of the list, the subject is asked to recall the items (e.g., by writing down as many items from the list as possible). It is called a free recall task because the subject is free to recall the items in any order that he or she desires.

===== Prompted (cued) recall =====
Prompted recall is a slight variation of free recall that consists of presenting hints or prompts to increase the likelihood that the behavior will be produced. Usually these prompts are stimuli that were not there during the training period. Thus in order to measure the degree of forgetting, one can see how many prompts the subject misses or the number of prompts required to produce the behavior.

==== Relearning method ====
This method measures forgetting by the amount of training required to reach the previous level of performance. German psychologist Hermann Ebbinghaus (1885) used this method on himself. He memorized lists of nonsensical syllables until he could repeat the list two times without error. After a certain interval, he relearned the list and saw how long it would take him to do this task. If it took fewer times, then there had been less forgetting. His experiment was one of the first to study forgetting.

==== Recognition ====
Participants are given a list of words and that they have to remember. Then they are shown the same list of material with additional information and they are asked to identify the material that was on the original list. The more they recognize, the less information is forgotten.

== Theories ==
The four main theories of forgetting apparent in the study of psychology are as follows:

=== Cue-dependent forgetting ===
Cue-dependent forgetting (also, context-dependent forgetting) or retrieval failure, is the failure to recall a memory due to missing stimuli or cues that were present at the time the memory was encoded. Encoding is the first step in creating and remembering a memory. How well something has been encoded in the memory can be measured by completing specific tests of retrieval. Examples of these tests would be explicit ones like cued recall or implicit tests like word fragment completion. Cue-dependent forgetting is one of five cognitive psychology theories of forgetting. This theory states that a memory is sometimes temporarily forgotten purely because it cannot be retrieved, but the proper cue can bring it to mind. A good metaphor for this is searching for a book in a library without the reference number, title, author or even subject. The information still exists, but without these cues retrieval is unlikely. Furthermore, a good retrieval cue must be consistent with the original encoding of the information. If the sound of the word is emphasized during the encoding process, the cue that should be used should also put emphasis on the phonetic quality of the word. Information is available however, just not readily available without these cues. Depending on the age of a person, retrieval cues and skills may not work as well. This is usually common in older adults but that is not always the case. When information is encoded into the memory and retrieved with a technique called spaced retrieval, this helps older adults retrieve the events stored in the memory better. There is also evidence from different studies that show age related changes in memory. These specific studies have shown that episodic memory performance does in fact decline with age and have made known that older adults produce vivid rates of forgetting when two items are combined and not encoded.

=== Organic causes ===
Forgetting that occurs through physiological damage or dilapidation to the brain are referred to as organic causes of forgetting. These theories encompass the loss of information already retained in long-term memory or the inability to encode new information again. Examples include Alzheimer's, amnesia, dementia, consolidation theory and the gradual slowing down of the central nervous system due to aging.

=== Interference theories ===
Interference theory refers to the idea that when the learning of something new causes forgetting of older material on the basis of competition between the two. This essentially states that memory's information may become confused or combined with other information during encoding, resulting in the distortion or disruption of memories. In nature, the interfering items are said to originate from an overstimulating environment. Interference theory exists in three branches: Proactive, Retroactive and Output. Retroactive and Proactive inhibition each referring in contrast to the other. Retroactive interference is when new information (memories) interferes with older information. On the other hand, proactive interference is when old information interferes with the retrieval of new information. This is sometimes thought to occur especially when memories are similar. Output Interference occurs when the initial act of recalling specific information interferes with the retrieval of the original information. Another reason why retrieval failure occurs is due to encoding failure. The information never made it to long-term memory storage. According to the level of processing theory, how well information is encoded depends on the level of processing a piece of information receives. Certain parts of information are better encoded than others; for example, information this visual imagery or that has a survival value is more easily transferred to the long-term memory storage. This theory shows a contradiction: an extremely intelligent individual is expected to forget more hastily than one who has a slow mentality. For this reason, an intelligent individual has stored up more memory in his mind which will cause interferences and impair their ability to recall specific information. Based on current research, testing interference has only been carried out by recalling from a list of words rather than using situation from daily lives, thus it is hard to generalize the findings for this theory. It has been found that interference related tasks decreased memory performance by up to 20%, with negative effects at all interference time points and large variability between participants concerning both the time point and the size of maximal interference. Furthermore, fast learners seem to be more affected by interference than slow learners. People are also less likely to recall items when intervening stimuli are presented within the first ten minutes after learning. Recall performance is better without interference. Peripheral processes such as encoding time, recognition memory and motor execution decline with age. However proactive interference is similar. Suggesting contrary to earlier reports that the inhibitory processes observed with this paradigm remain intact in older adults.

=== Trace decay theory ===
Decay theory states that when something new is learned, a neurochemical, physical "memory trace" is formed in the brain and over time this trace tends to disintegrate, unless it is occasionally used. Decay theory states the reason we eventually forget something or an event is because the memory of it fades with time. If we do not attempt to look back at an event, the greater the interval time between the time when the event from happening and the time when we try to remember, the memory will start to fade. Time is the greatest impact in remembering an event.

Trace decay theory explains memories that are stored in both short-term and long-term memory system, and assumes that the memories leave a trace in the brain. According to this theory, short-term memory (STM) can only retain information for a limited amount of time, around 15 to 30 seconds unless it is rehearsed. If it is not rehearsed, the information will start to gradually fade away and decay. Donald Hebb proposed that incoming information causes a series of neurons to create a neurological memory trace in the brain which would result in change in the morphological and/or chemical changes in the brain and would fade with time. Repeated firing causes a structural change in the synapses. Rehearsal of repeated firing maintains the memory in STM until a structural change is made. Therefore, forgetting happens as a result of automatic decay of the memory trace in brain. This theory states that the events between learning and recall have no effects on recall; the important factor that affects is the duration that the information has been retained. Hence, as longer time passes more of traces are subject to decay and as a result the information is forgotten.

One major problem about this theory is that in real-life situation, the time between encoding a piece of information and recalling it, is going to be filled with all different kinds of events that might happen to the individual. Therefore, it is difficult to conclude that forgetting is a result of only the time duration. It is also important to consider the effectiveness of this theory. Although it seems very plausible, it is about impossible to test. It is difficult to create a situation where there is a blank period of time between presenting the material and recalling it later.

This theory is supposedly contradicted by the fact that one is able to ride a bike even after not having done so for decades. "Flashbulb memories" are another piece of seemingly contradicting evidence. It is believed that certain memories "trace decay" while others do not. Sleep is believed to play a key role in halting trace decay, although the exact mechanism of this is unknown.

Physical and chemical changes in our brain lead to a memory trace, and this is based on the idea of the trace theory of memory. Information that gets into our short-term memory lasts a few seconds (15–20 seconds), and it fades away if it is not rehearsed or practiced as the neurochemical memory trace disappears rapidly. According to the trace decay theory of forgetting, what occurs between the creation of new memories and the recall of these memories is not influenced by the recall. However, the time between these events (memory formation and recalling) decides whether the information can be kept or forgotten. As there is an inverse correlation that if the time is short, more information can be recalled. On the other hand, if the time is long less information can be recalled or more information will be forgotten. This theory can be criticized for not sharing ideas on how some memories can stay and others can fade, though there was a long time between the formation and recall. Newness to something plays a crucial role in this situation. For instance, people are more likely to recall their very first day abroad than all of the intervening days between it and living there. Emotions also play a crucial role in this situation.

== Impairments and lack of forgetting ==
Forgetting can have very different causes than simply removal of stored content. Forgetting can mean access problems, availability problems, or can have other reasons such as amnesia caused by an accident.

An inability to forget can cause distress, as with post-traumatic stress disorder and hyperthymesia (in which people have an extremely detailed autobiographical memory).

== Social forgetting ==
Psychologists have called attention to "social aspects of forgetting". Though often loosely defined, social amnesia is generally considered to be the opposite of collective memory. "Social amnesia" was first discussed by Russell Jacoby, yet his use of the term was restricted to a narrow approach, which was limited to what he perceived to be a relative neglect of psychoanalytical theory in psychology. The cultural historian Peter Burke suggested that "it may be worth investigating the social organization of forgetting, the rules of exclusion, suppression or repression, and the question of who wants whom to forget what". In an in-depth historical study spanning two centuries, Guy Beiner proposed the term "social forgetting", which he distinguished from crude notions of "collective amnesia" and "total oblivion", arguing that "social forgetting is to be found in the interface of public silence and more private remembrance". The philosopher Walter Benjamin sees social forgetting closely linked to the question of present-day interests, arguing that "every image of the past that is not recognized by the present as one of its own concerns threatens to disappear irretrievably". Building on this, the sociologist David Leupold argued in the context of competing national narratives that what is suppressed and forgotten in one national narrative "might appear at the core of past narrations by the other" - thus often leading to diametrically opposed, mutually exclusive accounts on the past.

== See also ==
- Amnesia
- Cue-dependent forgetting
- Experience curve effects
- Educational psychology
- Hyperthymesia
- Language attrition
- Lotus tree
- Memory
- Pseudodementia
- Repressed memory
- Tip of the tongue
- Unethical amnesia

== Sources ==
- Wixted, John T. (February 2004). "The Psychology and Neuroscience of Forgetting". Annual Review of Psychology. 55 (1): 235–269. doi:10.1146/annurev.psych.55.090902.141555. PMID 14744216. S2CID 3057114.
- McLeod, S. A. (2008). Simply Psychology; . Retrieved 19 February 2012, from Simply Psychology
