= Recognition failure of recallable words =

Experimental phenomenon in cognitive psychology

The recognition failure of recallable words is an experimental phenomenon in cognitive psychology originally discovered by the memory researcher Endel Tulving and colleagues. Although recognition of previously-studied words through a recognition memory test, in which the words are re-presented for a memory judgment, generally yields a greater response probability than the recall of previously studied words through a recall test, in which the words must be mentally retrieved from memory, Tulving found that this typical result could be reversed by manipulating the retrieval cues provided at test.

Tulving's procedure first tested the recognition memory of participants for a list of paired associates using an item recognition procedure, to which participants responded "yes" if the pair of items was valid and "no" if the pair was invalid. Next, the participants were given a recall test, in which they were shown one item in each pair and attempted to recall from memory the matching item. Tulving discovered that some items which participants had failed to recognize during the item recognition trials were recalled successfully during the subsequent recall test.

As an example of this effect, many people will fail to recognize the name "James Fenimore Cooper" if "Cooper" is presented as the cue, yet they will easily recall the author's surname if given the appropriate retrieval cue, "What is the author with first name James Fenimore?" Although this example of recognition failure of recallable words occurs in semantic memory, Tulving has also demonstrated this phenomenon in episodic memory.

Tulving and Wiseman also examined the association between recognition and cued recall for individual list items. The resulting Tulving-Wiseman function describes the correlation between the probability of recalling an item and the probability of recognizing the item conditional on recall having been successful. The function predicts a moderate correlation between recognition and cued recall, suggesting a need to distinguish between retrieval based on the familiarity of an item's specific properties and retrieval based on the recollection of relational information between two items. There is also some contradictory evidence that bases recognition failure on retrieval failure.
