= Bilingual memory =

Bilingualism is the regular use of two fluent languages, and bilinguals are those individuals who need and use two (or more) languages in their everyday lives. A person's bilingual memories are heavily dependent on the person's fluency, the age the second language was acquired, and high language proficiency to both languages. High proficiency provides mental flexibility across all domains of thought and forces them to adopt strategies that accelerate cognitive development. People who are bilingual integrate and organize the information of two languages, which creates advantages in terms of many cognitive abilities, such as intelligence, creativity, analogical reasoning, classification skills, problem solving, learning strategies, and thinking flexibility.

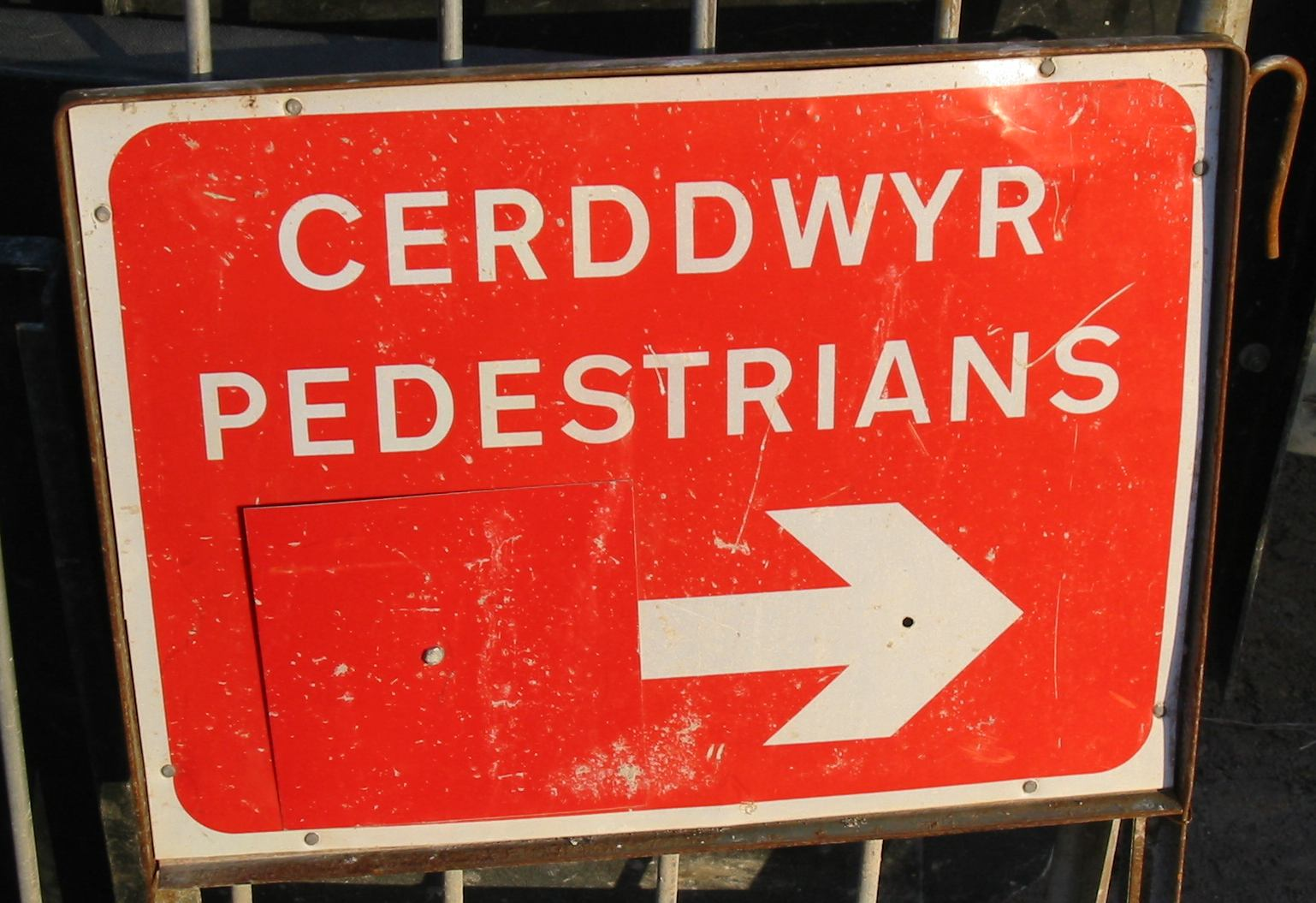
Bilingual pedestrian sign in English and Welsh

== History ==
One of the first researchers on the subject of bilingual memory and representation was linguist Uriel Weinreich. Languages in Contact, an essay published by Weinreich in 1953, proposed a model of bilingual memory organization that made the theoretical distinction between the lexical and conceptual level of representation. Three different types of organizational models were proposed: coordinate, compound, and subordinate, each having a different relationship between the lexical and conceptual levels of representation. In 1954, Ervin and Osgood reformulated Weinreich's compound-coordinate representational model and placed further emphasis on the context of language learning, similar to the encoding specificity principle later proposed by Tulving in the 1970s. In 1984, Potter et al. proposed the hierarchical model of bilingual memory, consisting of two memory structures, the word association model and concept mediation model. The word association model proposes a link between languages at the lexical level while the concept mediation model proposes a direct link between the conceptual representation and the lexical representation in each language. The hierarchical model was later revised by Kroll and Stewart in 1994 to account for linguistic proficiency and direction of translation, since then it has been subsequently revised.

== Biological basis of bilingual memories ==
One of the processes involved in analyzing which neural regions of the brain are involved in bilingual memory is a subtraction method. Researchers compare what has been impaired with what is functioning regularly. This contrast between the destroyed and intact regions of the brain aids researchers in discovering the components of language processing. It has been found that under typical circumstances, when multiple languages are lost at the same time, they are usually regained in the same fashion. It is therefore presumed that areas of the brain, which are responsible for processing language, are potentially the same. There have been examples of cases where languages have been restored prior to one another and to a greater degree, but this is fairly uncommon. The techniques allowing researchers to observe brain activity in multilingual patients are conducted whilst the subject is simultaneously performing and processing a language. Research has proposed that the entire production and comprehension of language is most likely regulated and managed by neural pools, whose stations of communication are in the cortical and subcortical regions. It has been shown that there are no grounds on which to assume the existence of distinct cerebral organization of separate languages in the bilingual brain. That is to say, the cerebral regions that are engaged for both languages are the same. Although neurologists have a basic understanding of the underlying neural components and mechanisms of bilingual language, further research is necessary in order to fully understand or conclude any other findings.

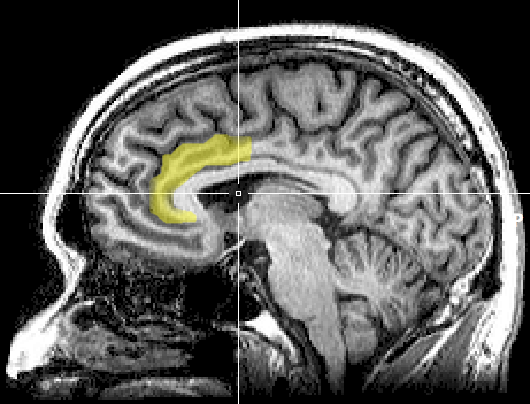
Anterior cingulate

Neuroimaging techniques such as fMRIs have shown that at least four brain areas are involved in bilingual switching: dorsolateral prefrontal cortex, inferior frontal cortex, anterior cingulate, and supramarginal gyrus. It is expected that switching from one language to another should involve different functional processes when compared to the brain of an individual who only speaks one language. However further studies on brain activation during this switching of languages needs to be done.

== Bilingual episodic memory ==
Episodic memory is closely related to semantic memory. Tulving created the two categories as a way to distinguish the specific knowledge from the general knowledge. Episodic memory contains the records of unique events which occurred at particular times. Particularly, autobiographical memories are stored in the episodic memory. The episodic memory holds the events from personal experiences in the past, exists in subjective time and space, requires a conscious recollection and a controlled process. Tulving referred to this as "mental time travel", and he "classifies encoding as an event, rather than a process".

It is suggested that bilinguals that have better control of their language processing should perform better in episodic than semantic memory tasks. Bilinguals store the input of language exceedingly well, regardless of their intention to learn. Language forms a surface in the progressive retrieval of features of an event (e.g., on College Ave, at Tim Hortons, on Tuesday...), that triggers further forms within the same language serving to guide retrieval. The events, objects, characters, etc. are all cued by linguistic elements that might serve as a series of triggers. This information is highly integrated; the superiority of action memory is due to better episodic integration for action memory (vs verbal); we remember events based on language cues and these cues further solidify the events.

To test episodic memory researchers usually use items that can be related to normal everyday life, such as sentences. Language recognition depends somewhat on the retrievability of meaning, but the extent of this dependence is unknown. Retrieval of memories is language-specific, it matches the language spoken at the time. Depending on what language is used, what is recalled may be different because a cue can activate many meanings. It is the context that conditions what meaning is considered first, and context can change over language and cultures.

Bilinguals also tend to be bicultural, it is known that we filter all of our experiences through culturally shaped scripts. So, those that are bilingual (for the most part bicultural) have multiple scripts to draw from, or more than one set of narrative constraints. All experiences imply some sort of narrative structure, and narrative traditions are culturally shaped. They direct our perception of reality and the encoding of memories. Though they may not directly determine their perception of reality, they determine "how the story is told" which may be different from "how it happened". This shapes memory, as stories that are deemed as worthy to be told are further solidified by the retelling and reliving of the experience.

=== Bilingual autobiographical memory ===
Autobiographical memory is a type of episodic memory process which is involved in the recall of one's life experiences and personal events of ones past. Bilinguals have the ability to recall some life experiences in one language, and other events using another. When recalling language information it is important that the language is recalled in the same context as it was encoded. This is referred to as context-dependent memory Ex. If one who is bilingual were to learn a Spanish song in a Spanish speaking country, and then come back to their native land, they would have difficulty remembering the song. However once they were immersed in a Spanish context again, recall would come with much more ease. Research has shown that autobiographical memories have increased availability in the language they were created in. That is to say, memories are richer and more elaborate when recalled in the language that the event has taken place, rather than the other language available to them. This can also be referred to as the encoding specificity principle, where memories appear to be encoded in a language-specific manner. Earlier memory events that occur during youth and are encoded in the first and dominant language, are more emotionally charged, have a higher quality of detail and are greater in number than those memories recalled in the second language. It can also be argued that the language that is spoken and recalled more frequently, will have more associations to multiple circumstances and is therefore more likely to be remembered. Problems can arise if a language that comes to mind 'internally' is not the language that is being spoken externally. For example, if someone recalled an event in Spanish, but then reported it in English. This changeover in languages is most likely to do with the content of the memory itself. Evidence has been shown that language-specific recall of information when probed or cued in the matching language, is recalled vividly, and with much more elaboration and detail. It has also been shown that each language that a bilingual possesses, may represent experiences in somewhat different fashions.

== Bilingual working memory ==
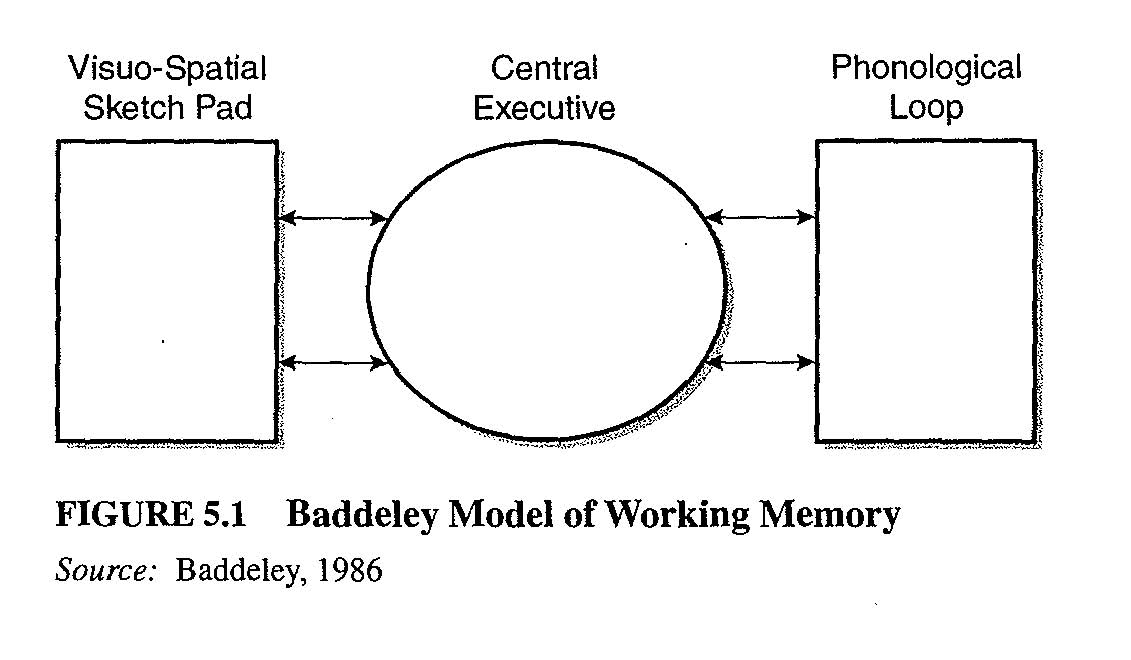
Alan Baddeley's Model of Working Memory

Working memory is an active part of the memory system that temporarily stores and processes information during mental operations. Highly related are the concepts of attention and executive control. A major function of the working memory system is the retention and processing of verbal information. Baddeley's model of working memory suggests the phonological loop, a slave system that is responsible for the rehearsal of verbal information and has been implicated in language acquisition.

Measures of verbal working memory are predictive of proficiency in a second language and working memory capacity is strongly correlated with first and second language abilities. Despite these correlations, research into the effects of bilingualism on working memory have been largely inconclusive. Bilingual performance on working memory tasks can be affected by language dominance, language proficiency, and the nature of the task, variables which can be difficult to control and assess. However, most recent research suggests that there are no differences between monolingual and bilingual individuals in regards to working memory performance, although more research is still required to make any conclusive claims. The evidence suggests that working memory performance has a stronger relationship with general linguistic proficiency than it does with the acquisition of a second language. It has also been observed that there are no significant cross-language differences within bilinguals, providing further support for the hypothesis that working memory is not language specific. Bilingual speakers are, however, more accurate in assessing their metalinguistic reading and working memory abilities compared to monolingual speakers.

=== Digit span ===
Research has found that there are cross-linguistic differences on a short-term memory test known as the digit-span task. For example, Chinese speakers as compared to English speakers had a greater digit span. An explanation of this observation is that digits in English take longer to say and subvocally rehearse in the phonological loop, a component of Baddely's model of working memory. It has been suggested that because memory for short words is better than for long words, a phenomenon known as the word-length effect, that there are cross-linguistic differences on the digit span task. This difference has also been observed in Welsh-English bilinguals, who rated themselves as more proficient in Welsh but had a greater digit span in English because of the shorter digit names. However, research has suggested that familiarity and long-term memory may play an important role and that differences are not strictly the result of subvocal rehearsal rates.

=== Inner speech ===
Our thoughts often occur as the inner speech of our natural language. Inner speech is used for such things as rehearsing facts, having a mental conversation with oneself, and counting, among many others. Being fluent in more than one language can affect inner speech in multiple ways. Studies have revealed that fluent bilinguals use their natural language to mentally represent exact numbers, however, non-numerical facts are retrieved in either language with equal ease. Bilingual individuals report feeling and acting different when in different linguistic mindsets and are capable of switching between them for the strategic purpose of activating different (context/language-dependent) information. As perceived language proficiency in a second languages increases, the use of that second language for inner speech becomes more habitual. As well, it has been reported that bilinguals who suffer from psychosis experience hallucinations or reduced linguistic competence in only one language.

== Bilingual semantic memory ==
Semantic memory is a term coined by Tulving and is closely related to episodic memory, it is a kind of mental dictionary containing all the attributes of event-free knowledge. It relates to general facts about the world (e.g., the sky is blue, 2+2=4) and it has no concern with time or space. Semantic memory does not require conscious thought, as it generally is automatic; it is not bound, except as interest links themes. It has been suggested that retrieval cues for semantic data are themselves semantic.

Recent studies have shown that knowing a second language extends semantic memory and other cognitive capabilities as they recruit different cognitive operations. It is shown to increase the normal capacity and expose the person to new situations and different ways of organizing thoughts. They learn to incorporate different concepts, and language specific inputs. The finding of a positive bilinguality effect for semantic memory provides support for the role of organization in bilinguality. Bilingualism and monolingualism semantic memory is often tested using word fluency tests, to gauge whether and how well these individuals organize their thoughts. These tests have indicated that the type of material is not necessarily of importance but rather the mental activity is more important. It is also found that the bilingualism effect can be observed more under automatic processing than under deliberate processing.

There are two predominant models of bilingual memory, the Hierarchical Model and the Concept features model. The Hierarchical Model assumes three linked components: a first language lexicon, a second language lexicon, and a conceptual store containing semantic referents. Links between words in the first language lexicon and their meanings in the underlying conceptual store would be strong for bilinguals. For newer bilinguals links running from the second language lexicon to the conceptual store would be relatively weak, if present at all, the links from the second language lexicon to the first language lexicon would be the strong ones. So the bilingual would translate the word from the second language into the first language and from there access the conceptual store (Cheval to horse to basic idea of a horse vs. cheval to basic idea of a horse). Fluent bilinguals have stronger and more direct links to the conceptual store form both languages. In the Concept Features Model, when words have highly prototypical, concrete referents (desk, juice) the translations in both languages would activate the same set of underlying semantic nodes. In more conceptual and abstract referents (poverty, intelligence) translation equivalents activate different but overlapping sets of semantic nodes.

In bilingual memory as Colin M. MacLeod found the two translated words (e.g., Horse and Cheval) are not stored as synonyms, they share the same supralinguistic semantic representation in memory (a supralinguistic concept is an abstraction of meaning more primitive than the word itself, it cannot be defined). It is stored in a kind of tag on a language free semantic representation of the world, where the input language is stored as a semantic trace.

In general a positive effect of bilingualism in semantic memory is more pronounced for older than for younger children. Since bilingual children engage in extensive practice of two languages at an early age, they become better at paying attention to parts of information and at inhibiting other parts. Overall they have better recall and recognition in letter fluency especially when older and more educated, but the more similarity between their two languages lessens the advantage, as when they are very close there is more overlap of information.

=== Bilingual mental lexicon ===
Mental lexicon refers to the permanent store of words in an individual's memory, and is thought to be organized in a semantic network. This network is related to the spreading activation model proposed by Collins and Loftus, as one word (node) is activated, words that are semantically and lexically related will also be activated, the same being applied to one or more languages.

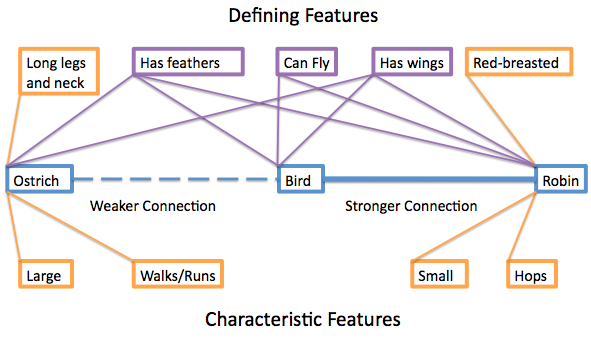
Mental Lexicon Model

Evidence has been found to support the view that a bilingual individual has the same conceptual system for both of their languages. Dong, Gui, and Macwhinney have demonstrated the convergence of a new language into a preexisting mental lexicon in their article "Shared and Separate Meanings in the Bilingual Mental Lexicon". When a person first learns a second language, the language has its own conceptual system and is heavily reliant on the first language to gain understanding and meaning of the new words. For example, a Spanish learner is learning the word gato, and will refer back to their original language (ex. English) to translate it into "cat" to gain meaning, relation, and contextual information surrounding that word. However, the more advanced an individual becomes in acquiring a certain language, the two conceptual systems will eventually converge into one, where one language influences the other and vice versa.

=== Tip of the tongue in bilinguals ===
It has been found that bilinguals are more susceptible to the tip of the tongue, in cases where the phonology of a word is different in both languages. For example, when recalling a word such as "hair" in English, there is more interference from the French word cheveux, because they sound and are spelled differently. However, when a word is phonologically similar in both languages, bilinguals produce fewer errors than individuals who are monolingual. For example, the word "chocolate" is similar to the translated word in French, which is chocolat. Overall, bilinguals experience the tip of the tongue phenomenon more than individuals who are monolingual. This is confirmed by the evidence that bilinguals are less able to recall words, or initiate representations of words that are different in each language.

Tip-of-the-tongue phenomenon occurs due to a temporary phonological encoding failure in the process of lexical retrieval. While tip-of-the-tongue generally occurs with words that bilinguals may experience more retrieval failures than monolinguals, but when it comes to proper names, bilinguals tend to report fewer tip-of-the-tongue experiences than those who only speak one language. One study showed that even though bilinguals experience more tip-of-the-tongue's than monolinguals when it comes to recalling specific words, they did not experience any more tip-of-the-tongue's in everyday speech than monolinguals.

There are two hypotheses as to why the tip-of-the-tongue phenomenon may occur more frequently with bilinguals. The first is called the weaker links hypothesis and says that because bilinguals spread their time between two languages, the word-finding process is not used as often as it is for monolinguals. By using each language less, this could lead to a weak link between the semantic and phonological system. Results from several studies have found that tip-of-the tongue occurs because of the less frequent use of words in each language. The second hypothesis is called the competition for selection hypothesis. According to this hypothesis, there are alternative words that are competing for selection during the process of production for a bilingual.

== Dual-coding theory ==
The dual-coding theory was first postulated by Paivio and Desrochers in 1980, and indicates that two systems are responsible for the encoding and retrieval of information from memory. The verbal representational system encodes verbal information, such as words. While the imagery system encodes and retrieves non-verbal objects, such as images and scenes. The dual-coding theory enunciates that these two systems can operate independently, as well as interdependently. Therefore, verbal cues can be activated independently of images, and vice versa. However verbal cues can also prime images through associative relationships, while images can prime verbal items through associative connections as well. This is not surprising, as a person can often describe an image using verbal behaviors, indicating the interconnectedness of the two systems. This theme continues into the bilingual adaptation of the dual-coding theory, which indicates that an individual's verbal representational systems for their two languages operate independently of one another, but also have associative connections with each other. For example, thinking of synonyms for "fierce" using English words, would only involve the English language system. But if a person is required to translate the word "fierce" into the French version, this would entail the two language systems to have associative connections. Indicating that the two language systems can act independently of each other, and that each language system has their own within language connections.

Some flaws with the bilingual dual coding theory have been identified. One of which deals with the constant finding that translated items are better recollected than the words that are directly recalled or require deriving synonyms for. This was originally thought because translated words are better remembered because they engage both memory systems, compared to synonyms which require the use of only one memory system. With this in mind, it was also thought that between language systems have stronger associations, compared to within language systems. This means that there are well developed associations for the translated words because there are stronger associations between two languages, compared to the connections within only one language, as seen with synonyms. Other explanations have also been explored to explain this phenomenon, one is that the translated words are better remembered because they are more deeply processed than words that people are simply asked to recall or create synonyms for. This is in line with the levels of processing effect, where in relation to the bilingual dual coding theory, words that participants are required to think of synonyms for are better recalled than the words they were simply asked to copy. This is because creating synonyms requires deeper processing than just duplicating a word. Similarly, words that participants are required to translate will be better remembered than the words they created synonyms for.

== Language-dependent recall ==
Language-dependent recall is a phenomenon that signifies memories are best recalled when the language at encoding matches the language during recall. This is related to the encoding specificity principle purposed by Tulving and Thompson, which states that recall is better when the retrieval context is similar to the context in which the memory was encoded.

Language-dependent recall is also significantly related to context-dependent memory. In the perspective of bilingualism, context dependent memory indicates that the language spoken during the encoding of the event acts as the external context. Whereas the language that a person thinks, rehearses and conducts inner speech constitutes the internal environment. Therefore, it is important to reinstate these internal and external contexts in which a person encodes the memory in order to enhance recall.

Consequently, this has major impacts on bilingual individuals, who can interchangeably encode a memory in English, for instance, and encode another memory in French due to their diverse language capabilities. An example of context-dependent memory in the case of bilingualism is seen in an example by Viorica and Kaushanskaya. They asked participants this question: "name a statue of someone standing with a raised arm while looking into the distance". This inquiry was asked in two separate languages, English and Mandarin. When asked the question in Mandarin, the individuals were more likely to say the "Statue of Mao". However, when asked in English, the participants said the "Statue of Liberty". Furthermore, when a person encodes a memory in English, but is asked about the memory in French, their inner verbalization of the memory, matches that during the encoding (i.e. they are remembering the event in the language that it was encoded with). Thus indicating the importance of reinstating the internal and external context during retrieval to match the context during encoding.

Accordingly, autobiographical memories and semantic knowledge can be impaired when the language during the recall (ex. English) of the memory does not match the language during encoding (ex. French). However, there are several benefits when the contexts do match. For example, Viorica and Fausey found that when the linguistics at encoding match the linguistics during retrieval it increases the speed, accuracy, and emotional intensity of the memory. Thus suggesting that language impacts the cues that are involved in the retrieval of bilingual memories.

In a study by Luna Filipović, bilingual memory recall was tested in order to see if bilinguals use both languages to access memories. It was found that when Spanish-English speakers were in bilingual mode they were likely to draw from both of their languages in regards to grammatical as well as conceptual differences. However, the results of this study also found that monolingual speakers in both Spanish and English tended to describe and recall information differently. For example, Spanish speakers tended to use two different constructions in describing and recalling information: one construct for intentional events and one for non-intentional events. Intentional events tend to be described the same way in both Spanish and English, however unintentional events are described differently.

== Advantages to bilingual memory ==
It has been found that being bilingual can have many advantages, including advantages in cognitive abilities and memory. While this topic remains somewhat controversial, a large amount of research points to the idea that there are in fact cognitive advantages to being bilingual despite earlier research saying that bilinguals may have cognitive detriments.

=== Advantages in working memory, executive control and word learning ===
Those who are bilingual have shown to be more efficient in their executive functioning. They are more effective in deploying resources that aid in attention. They have also shown that they are less likely to be affected by irrelevant information. In a study conducted by Kaushanskaya, it was found that bilinguals were better at learning new, novel words than monolinguals. This could, in part, be due to the experience bilinguals have with learning new words. In an experiment involving Hindi-English speakers, it was found that bilinguals showed advantages in working memory. They were also more advantaged than monolinguals when it came to response inhibition. In a study that compared bilingual 18-month-olds to monolingual 18-month-olds, it was found that bilinguals tended to perform significantly better in cued recall and memory generalization than their monolingual counterpart.

=== Advantages in visuospatial and phonological short-term memory ===
There is evidence that bilinguals tend to rank higher than monolinguals in visuo-spatial memory. One study asked participants to detect changes in the same visual scenes and showed that bilinguals outperformed monolinguals in how fast they were able to detect those changes. This showed that there was an advantage for bilinguals in non-verbal reasoning. This may also be explained by bilinguals' ability to be flexible in managing their attention for various task demands.

One study had 83 English-Chinese bilinguals complete nonverbal executive control tasks following comprehension language tasks. In this study, it was found that bilinguals have larger resources having to do with task mixing and working memory that helped to prevent lower performance.

== See also ==
- Bilingual education
- Cognitive advantages to bilingualism
- Memory
- Multilingualism
- Neuroanatomy of memory
