= Contextual cueing effect =

In psychology, contextual cueing refers to a form of visual search facilitation which describe targets appearing in repeated configurations are detected more quickly. The contextual cueing effect is a learning phenomenon where repeated exposure to a specific arrangement of target and distractor items leads to progressively more efficient search.

== Theoretical Background ==
In a global context, massive amounts of sensory input are received on a daily basis that would require an unrealistic amount of cognitive resources for it all to be processed. The concept of contextual cueing is that the brain has developed sophisticated mechanisms that aid us to subconsciously encode invariant visual information for the purpose of saving cognitive resources. Contextual information thereby becomes relevant because it embodies these fundamental unchanging properties of the visual environment such as stable spatial layout information – surroundings you see that do not vary in appearance and location over time.

As an everyday example, imagine a situation in which one searches for a car in a parking lot. Different search strategies can be adopted depending on whether one searches for a car in a global scene context (e.g., searching on the west side of the parking lot) or in a local configural context (e.g., searching for a car parked between two yellow cars). Cognitive resources can thus be saved by scoping attention to specific contexts – how and where it should be deployed. Contextual cueing takes advantage of this by intrinsic learning of static spatial layouts and maps them into memory representations that expedites search. Memory representations can be viewed as associations between spatial configurations (context) and target locations. Sensitivity to these invariant regularities presented in visual context serves to guide visual attention, object recognition and action.

Researches of contextual cueing tasks are additionally helpful in understanding the neural substrates of implicit learning. For example, amnesic patients with hippocampal damage are impaired in their learning of novel contextual information, even though learning in the contextual cueing task does not appear to rely on conscious retrieval of contextual memory traces. Chun (2000) pointed the neural circuitries within the hippocampus and associated medial temporal lobe structures as likely candidates for encoding contextual information in the brain, independent of awareness.

== Theory development ==
=== Early studies ===
The standard contextual-cueing task first developed by Chun and Jiang in 1998 pioneered research in the development of this area of study. The results showed how, in global contexts, implicit learning and memory of visual context can navigate spatial attention towards task-relevant aspects of a scene.

==== General paradigm ====
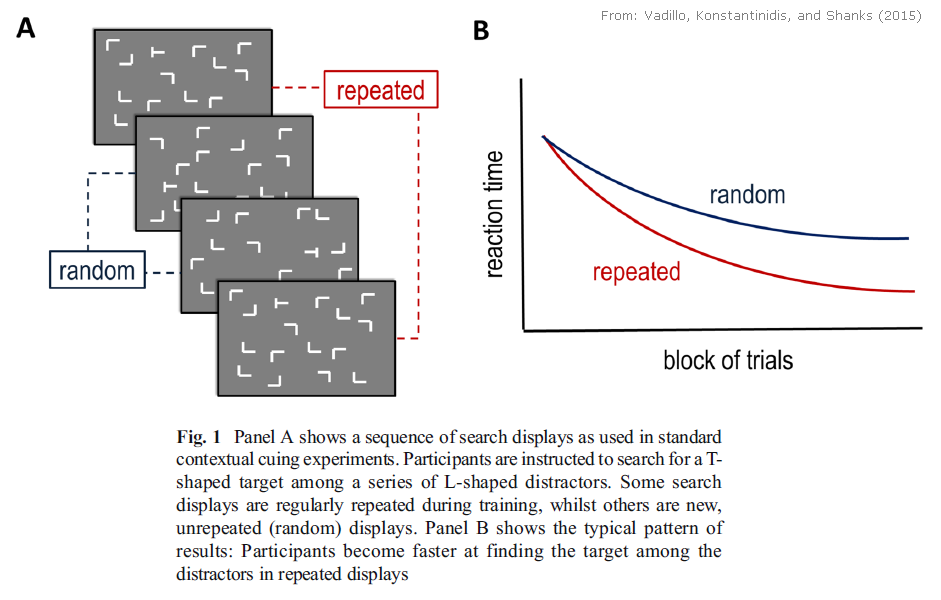
Example of a contextual cueing effect paradigm (Vadillo et al., 2015)

In their experiment, participants searched for a T-shaped target amongst L-shaped distractors. Unbeknownst to participants, the search arrays can be bisected. Search trials were divided into multiple blocks. Within each block, half of the search displays presented novel item arrangements. In those ‘new’ displays, the target and distractors changed locations randomly across trials to serve as a control baseline. The other half of the search displays were repeatedly presented between blocks of trials. That is, ‘old’ displays, in which the locations of both the target and the distractors were kept constant. Essentially, old displays are fixed in their position. Sensitivity to global configurations should lead to faster target search performance in repeated (old) configurations compared to baseline (new) configurations that were newly generated for each block if contextual information was learned.

The main finding was that reaction times (RTs) were faster to targets appearing in old compared to new spatial arrangements. Their results demonstrated that a robust memory for visual context exists to guide spatial attention. This newly discovered form of search facilitation spawned the term ‘contextual cueing’. Chun and Jiang argued that it is a result of incidentally learned associations between spatial configurations (context) and target locations.

In a recognition test at the end of the experiment, participants were typically unable to distinguish old and new displays to a level better than chance. Improved search performance was obtained despite chance recognition for the configurations, suggesting that the memory for context was implicit. Recently, the role of consciousness in contextual cueing has become a controversial topic (for a review, see). Since its inception, the contextual cueing paradigm has proven to be a well-established tool in the investigation of visual search.

=== Recent studies ===
The contextual cueing effect at least partially account for why expertise has been demonstrated to affect performance on a wide range of visually based tasks.

A study conducted by Brockmole et al. (2008) showed implications of why chess experts are more able to recite a game of chess. In their 2-part experiment, chess boards served as the apparatus for learning context as their meaningfulness is dependent on the observer’s knowledge of the game.

In their first experiment, the chess boards depicted actual game play, and search benefits for repeated boards were four times greater for experts than for novices. In the second experiment, search benefits among experts were halved when less meaningful randomly generated boards were used. Thus, stimulus meaningfulness independently contributes to learning context – chess piece associations.

One general mechanism that may underlie this expertise effect is an enhanced ability to use semantic information over and above strictly visual information to predict the locations of a display’s task-relevant content. Nevertheless, experts were apt to learn the association between an arbitrarily located target and an array of randomly selected and positioned playing pieces; approximately half of the rate of learning and resulting learning benefit was retained compared to a situation where board layouts reflected actual game-play. On this basis, this difference seems to be, at least in part, a reflection of the degree of contextual information contained in those displays.

Likewise, tennis and cricket experts are better able to anticipate the movement of balls following serves and pitches. Ice hockey experts fixate tactically critical areas more rapidly when making defensive strategy decisions in real time. Gymnastics experts make fewer and longer fixations when searching for performance errors. Reliable effects of search time facilitation were also found in a younger cohort of 8–12 year old participants, further suggesting the inherent aspect of the contextual cue effect.

Similar research has displayed the same result as far back as in the 1970s by Chase and Simon (1973). However, ideas of the contextual cueing effect were not materialized until Chun and Jiang’s seminal study in 1998.

== Underlying mechanism ==
Equivocal explanations for contextual cueing have been discussed in this literature. At the moment, a definitive elucidation for the underlying mechanisms has yet to be concluded.

In contextual cueing, distractor and target items are accompanied by various features. Some examples of the items' features would be the relative hue, size and shape. An item is said to be more salient if it stands out from the rest in these features (the odd-one-out). Studies have been conducted to examine whether the contextual cueing effect would be accentuated when the targets are more salient; evidence on the influence is undecided. Geyer et al. (2010) conducted experiments which required search for a single target that differed significantly in colour compared to the rest of the items. It was found repeated, relative to novel arrangements of items led to an improvement in detection accuracy and RTs. Thus, they argued when finding salient targets, contextual cueing can improve search. On the contrary, Conci et al. (2011) manipulated the relative size of all distractors compared to the target stimulus. Their results demonstrated reduced effects of contextual cueing when the size of the distractors is different compared to the control condition in which all items were of the same size, thereby counteracting the previous results posed by Geyer et al. (2010).

Current literature on how contextual cueing occur is also rather mixed. One view is that contextual cueing is determined by proximity; this was found evident by results that exclusively display items in the vicinity of the target are acquired in contextual learning. This view proposed the contextual cueing effect operates when attention is scoped on a molecular level. By contrast, other studies suggested that observers form associations between the target and the entire distractor background. These findings indicate it is the global context that is necessary for the contextual cueing effect to function.

Some described contextual cueing effect as a case of spatial congruency bias – a phenomenon where two separately presented items are deemed more similar to each other if they were shown in the same location. Research has shown even just subtle differences in the location of objects can drastically alter the subject’s perception of the display’s similarity. Specifically, in the contextual cue paradigm, targets in old displays are thereby associated with greater similarity compared to new displays due to all the items being in identical location. As a result, identifying similar targets will enable faster memory encoding and strengthen memory retrieval.

== See also ==
- Context-dependent memory
- Intertrial priming
- Object-based attention
