= Recall test =

In cognitive psychology, a recall test is a test of memory of mind in which participants are presented with stimuli and then, after a delay, are asked to remember as many of the stimuli as possible. Memory performance can be indicated by measuring the percentage of stimuli the participant was able to recall. An example of this would be studying a list of 10 words and later recalling 5 of them. This is a 50 percent recall. Participants' responses also may be analyzed to determine if there is a pattern in the way items are being recalled from memory. For example, if participants are given a list consisting of types of vegetables and types of fruit, their recall can be assessed to determine whether they grouped vegetables together and fruits together. Recall is also involved when a person is asked to recollect life events, such as graduating high school, or to recall facts they have learned, such as the capital of Florida.

Measuring recall contrasts with measuring recognition, in which people are asked to pick an item that has previously been seen or heard from a number of other items that have not been previously seen or heard, which occurs, for example, during a typical multiple-choice question exam.

== Types of recall ==
=== Free recall test ===
Free recall is one of the most commonly used recall tests. In free recall tests participants are asked to study a list of words and then are asked to recall the words in whatever order they choose to recall them in. The words the participants are to recall are typically presented one at a time and for a short duration. The recalling of the words starts immediately after the final item being recalled is shown. The items can be listed either through verbal or written recall. Immediate recall of the items(Immediate Free Recall) is the most common form of free call tests, but recall of the items can be delayed(Delayed Free Recall). Both the immediate free recall and delayed free recall have been used to test the recency and primacy effects. Free recall is most often used to measure the number of items recalled from a list. Murdock in an experiment on serial position effects, used six groups of 103 participants. Each group was given different combinations of list lengths and presentation rates. Three of the groups were shown lists of ten, fifteen, and twenty words with a presentation rate of two seconds per word. The other three groups were shown lists of twenty, thirty, and forty words with a one-second presentation rate for each word. There were eighty lists in total that included randomly selected common English words. After the presentation of each list, subjects were asked to recall as many words as possible in any order. Results from the experiment showed that all groups expressed both primacy effects and recency effects. Recency effects were exhibited regardless of the length of the list, and it was strongest for the words in the last eight serial positions. The primacy effect extended over the first four serial positions. Serial recall paradigm is a form of free recall where the participants have to list the items presented to them in the correct order they are presented in. Research shows that the learning curve for serial recall increases linearly with every trial. Bruno, Miller, and Zimmerman (1955) in an experiment tested to learn why the serial recall learning curve increases linearly. They were testing to see if this linear increase is a result of the order in which the participant sees the items, or if it is instead dependent on the order in which the participant is told to recall the items. The study involved three different conditions: serial recall, free recall with items to be recalled randomized before each trial, and free recall with the order of the items kept constant. The experiment tested nine college students on 18 series of words. In addition to the linear serial recall learning curve, it was found that more words are forgotten when recall is free than when it is serial. This study also supported the notion that the difference between the types of recall depends on the order in which the learner must recall the items, and not on the order in which the items are presented.

=== Cued recall test ===
A cued recall test is a procedure for testing memory in which a participant is presented with cues, such as words or phrases, to aid recall of previously experienced stimuli. Endel Tulving and Zena Pearlstone (1966) conducted an experiment in which they presented participants with a list of words to be remembered. The words were from specific categories such as birds (pigeon, sparrow), furniture (chair, dresser), and professions (engineer, lawyer). The categories were not made apparent in the original list. Participants in the free recall group were asked to write down as many words as they could remember from the list. Participants in the cued recall group were also asked to recall the words, but this group was provided with the names of the categories, "birds", "furniture", and "professions". The results of Tulving and Pearlstone's experiment demonstrate that retrieval cues aid memory. Participants in the free recall group recalled 40 percent of the words, whereas participants in the cued recall group recalled 75 percent of the words.

== Factors affecting recall ==
=== Encoding specificity ===
The principle of encoding specificity states that we encode information along with its context. The memory utilizes cues from which the information was encoded and from the environment in which it is being retrieved. An experiment demonstrating encoding specificity was conducted by D. R. Godden and Alan Baddeley (1975) in their "diving experiment". During this experiment, one group of participants studied a list of words underwater while another group of participants studied the same list of words on land. These groups were then divided, so half of the participants in the land and water groups were tested for recall on land and half were tested underwater. The participants demonstrated a better recall when the context of retrieval matched the context of encoding, for example having studied underwater and being tested underwater.

=== State-dependent learning ===
This is another example of how matching the conditions at the encoding and retrieval can influence memory. State-dependent learning is associated with a specific internal state, such as mood or state of awareness. According to the principle of state-dependent learning, memory will be better when a person's internal state during retrieval matches his or her internal state during encoding. Two ways of matching encoding and retrieval include matching the physical situation (encoding specificity) or an internal feeling (state-dependent learning).

=== Transfer-appropriate processing ===
Transfer -appropriate processing (TAP) shows that our ability to recall information well is not only dependent on the depth at which we learn it. It shows that how we connect the information and build relationships with other encoded memories is important in being able to recall the information. Schendan and Kutas (2007) performed an experiment in which they confirmed that recall of memories is best when we match the situations. They found that significantly more memory can be recalled when what has been learned is grouped together and paired with what the sensory information is saying was learned Franks, and colleagues performed thirteen experiments on TAP and found that memory is best enhanced when the learning situation was matched to the retrieval situation.

=== Levels of processing theory ===
The idea behind the levels of processing theory is that the depth of processing effects how well you encode the information you are learning. Craik and Tulving performed a study in 1975 where the participants were presented a list of 60 words each word having three questions. The questions varied from requiring them to think about the word to just remembering what they saw. Craik and Tulving discovered that the words that required deeper processing were remembered best. Craik and Tulving also discovered that the more familiar the stimulus is recalling the information is increased. The reason for this being when a stimulus is presented is familiar it already has many connections to memories that have been encoded. These connections to the encoded memories strengthens the memory of the stimulus being presented. Levels of processing theory goes even further to show that recall is increased when asked to remember in the way it was originally presented to us.
