= Encoding specificity principle =

Memory process-related theory

The encoding specificity principle is the general principle that matching the encoding contexts of information at recall assists in the retrieval of episodic memories. It provides a framework for understanding how the conditions present while encoding information relate to memory and recall of that information.

It was introduced by Thomson and Tulving who suggested that contextual information is encoded with memories which affect the retrieval process. When a person uses information stored in their memory it is necessary that the information is accessible. The accessibility is governed by retrieval cues, these cues are dependent on the encoding pattern; the specific encoding pattern may vary from instance to instance, even if nominally the item is the same, as encoding depends on the context. This conclusion was drawn from a recognition-memory task. A series of psychological experiments were undertaken in the 1970s which continued this work and further showed that context affects our ability to recall information.

The context may refer to the context in which the information was encoded, the physical location or surroundings, as well as the mental or physical state of the individual at the time of encoding. This principle plays a significant role in both the concept of context-dependent memory and the concept of state-dependent memory.

Examples of the use of the encoding specificity principle include; studying in the same room as an exam is taken and the recall of information when intoxicated being easier when intoxicated again.

== Development of the Concept ==
Ebbinghaus, a pioneer of research into memory, noted that associations between items aids recall of information thus the internal context of a list matters. This is because we look for any connection that helps us combine items into meaningful units. This started a lot of research into lists of to-be-remembered (tbr) words, and cues that helped them. In 1968 Tulving and Osler made participants memorise a list of 24 tbr words in the absence or presence of cue words. The cue words facilitated recall when present in the input and output of memorising and recalling the words. They concluded that specific retrieval cues can aid recall if the information of their relation to the tbr words is stored at the same time as the words on the list. Tulving and Thomson studied the effect of the change in context of the tbr by adding, deleting and replacing context words. This resulted in a reduction in the level of recognition performance when the context changed, even though the available information remained context. This led to the encoding specificity principle.

== Role of Semantics ==
Semantics do not always play a role in encoding specificity; memory, rather, depends upon the context at encoding and retrieval. Early research has shown that semantically related cues should be effective in retrieving a word provided the semantic cue was encoded along with the target word. If the semantically related word is not present at the time of encoding, it will not be efficient at cuing recall for the target word.

In a laboratory study, a subject presented with an unrelated word pair is able to recall a target word with much more accuracy when prompted with the unrelated word it was matched with at the time of encoding, than if presented with a semantically related word that was not available during the time of encoding. During a recall task, people benefit equally from a weakly related cue word as from a strongly related cue word, provided the weakly related word was present at encoding.

Regardless of semantic relatedness of the paired words, participants more effectively recalled target words that had been primed when prompted for recall. Many of the following experiments employed a method modeled off of Thomson and Tulving's. All, however, had slight variations which allowed the researchers to discover their own individual findings. The following table shows the importance of priming through word pairs to achieve enhanced recall of words encoded together.

Paired-associate list and four types of prompters
Stimulus	Response	1 (.01-.08)	2 (.09-.21)	3 (.23-.36)	4 (.38-.59)
TIME	blue	velvet (.03)	grey (.1)	green (.28)	azure (.58)
SHOE	book	print (.02)	comic (.15)	read (.35)	chapter (.59)
TOP	chair	leg (.02)	cushion (.09)	upholstery (.36)	furniture (.48)
WENT	telephone	pole (.04)	extension (.17)	communication (.33)	dial (.59)
TILE	girl	child (.03)	cute (.18)	feminine (.26)	coed (.54)

Modeled after Table 1 Bahrick (1970)

== Encoding Contexts ==
Multiple studies have shown a dependence on context of one's environment as an aid to recall specific items and events.

=== Physical environment ===
The location and environment in which one learns something readily affects how freely it is recalled. In an experiment by Godden and Baddeley in 1975, researchers took two groups of individuals and asked them to study and remember a list of given words. One group was given a list of words to study while underwater in scuba gear, the other was given the same list on dry land. When asked to recall the information the participants remembered the list of words better when tested in the environment where the list was studied. This experiment illustrates how recreating the physical environment of encoding can aid in the retrieval process.

The type of environment itself did not matter, just that the environment was constant during encoding and recall, as the effect on recall of the environment of recall depends on the environment of original learning. Memory tested through recognition, however, was not affected. This phenomenon is explained by what is termed the outshining hypothesis: context can be a useful cue for memory but only when it is needed. One will only turn to context as a cue when better cues are unavailable. In recognition tests, cues other than the immediate encoding context and environment are superior, whereas in free-recall tests, the immediate environment serves as the only cue to trigger memory.

=== Auditory environment ===
The level and kind of noise in any given encoding environment will affect the ability to recall the information encoded in a different auditory environment. Grant, et al. (1998) performed a study to test how the auditory environment during encoding and the auditory environment during testing effected recall and recognition during a test. In the study 39 participants were asked to read through an article one time, knowing that they would take a short test on the material. Each of the participants wore headphones while reading but some of the participants heard moderately loud background noise and others heard nothing. They found that regardless of the type of test, it is more beneficial to study and test in the same auditory environment. In line with the encoding specificity principle, this mismatch at encoding and retrieval is detrimental to test performance.

Language and the voluntary retrieval of autobiographical memories

Autobiographical memories are more accessible when the language at encoding and recall match. Researchers conducted interviews with Russian and English speaking bilingual students in both languages and asked participants to retrieve the first memory that comes to mind when hearing a generic word in either language. They found that when presented with Russian-language cues, participants recalled memories that occurred in a Russian-speaking environment and when presented with English-language cues, they easily recalled memories from English-speaking contexts. This is first because the cue words may have been spoken during the original event that the participant was remembering; hearing the word at encoding and again at retrieval may have been a sufficient cue to bring the memory to mind. Second, this phenomenon may be due to the general language-created ambiance of the situation in which participants were tested rather than the specific associations to individual cue words.

== Specific Examples ==
=== Diagnosis of disease ===
Patients with Alzheimer's disease (AD) are unable to effectively process the semantic relationship between two words at encoding to assist in the retrieval process. The general population benefits equally from a weakly related cue word as from a strongly related cue word during a recall task, provided the weakly related word was present at encoding. Patients with AD, however, were unable to benefit from the weakly related cue even if it was present at both encoding and retrieval. Instead of relying upon semantic encoding, those with AD presented their most dominant associations to the cue words during recall test. This explains why all AD patients performed well when two strong words were matched together but very poorly when a strong and weak pairs were presented during recall. Deficits in episodic memory are now widely accepted as a characteristic symptom of Alzheimer's disease.

=== Alcohol ===
Information encoded and stored while intoxicated, see state-dependent memory, is retrieved more effectively when an individual is intoxicated as compared to being sober. State-dependent memory is one example of encoding specificity. If an individual encodes information while intoxicated he or she, ideally, should match that state when attempting to recall the encoded information. This type of state-dependent effect is strongest with free recall rather than when strong retrieval cues are present.

This finding is a variation of the context-dependency effect of the encoding specificity principle and is much more apparent with low-imagery words than high-imagery words. Both high and low imagery words, however, are less likely to be recalled while intoxicated due to the inherent nature of intoxication. This principle demonstrates the significance of encoding specificity; the contextual state of intoxication provides retrieval cues and information that are superior to and outweigh the negative effects on memory from a depressant substance that activates GABA and inhibits neurotransmission. In this regard, this encoding specific context trumps the importance of such neural brain activity.

=== Advertising ===
The emotional nature of advertisements affects the rate of recall for the advertised product. When the nature of the advertisement was emotional, an encoding focus on episodic memory (trying to carefully remember the visual content of the commercial) led to a much higher rate of recall for emotional advertisements. Conversely, al peptions, preferences of given object advertised) led to a much higher recall of specific advertisements. Empirical evidence regarding the nature of emotional advertising provides the advertising industry with data as to how to contour their ads to maximize recall of advertisements. Political advertising displays this emotional nature of content. A political advertisement from Lyndon B. Johnson's 1964 presidential campaign is inherently emotional in nature and therefore very easily remembered. If this advertisement re viewed and encoded in an episodic mode, due to its emotional nature, it would be easily recalled because of the mode of memory during the encoding process. This advertisement is a lasting example of emotional advertisements being easily recalled: it aired only once on September 7, 1964, yet is one of the most remembered and famous campaign advertisements to date.

=== Studying ===
The encoding specificity principle has an implication for studying; as the recall of information is aided by the context of encoding the information, suggesting one should study in a similar context to the exam. The way an individual studies should match the way he or she is tested. If one is tested on application of principles to new examples, then one should practice by applying principles during the study session. When students know the requirements for a test or the performance task they can better encode the information while studying and can perform at a higher level when tested. Studying information in a manner that is closest to the method of assessment is the optimal method of studying due to it aiding recall of the information in a similar context to that of the assessment.

== Criticism ==
James S. Nairne of Purdue University is the primary opponent of Thomson and Tulving's encoding specificity principle. He argues that the encoding-retrieval match is correlational rather than causal and states that many cognitive psychologists consider the principle to be "sacrosanct". Nairne suggests that what determines successful memory is cue distinctiveness. He says that good memory may be produced even if there is almost no encoding-retrieval overlap, provided the minimal overlap is highly distinctive. He characterizes memory as an "active process of discrimination" and proposes that we use cues to choose between several retrieval candidates. Increasing the encoding-retrieval match improves memory performance, he believes, but only because it increases the probability that distinctive features will come into play.

Phillip Higham has also criticised the design and interpretation of Thomson and Tulving's original experiments which used strong and weak cues to generate the encoding specificity principle. He states that the use of forced-report retrieval may have resulted in participants responding to the cues positively, not due to them being encoded at the time of learning but due to pre-experimentally derived associations. Suggesting that the word on the list 'came to mind' at the time of the experiment and that anyone could have given the positive answer. This is seen as even more likely with strong cues. This is known as the 'lucky guessing' criticism.

In 1975 Leo Postman conducted experiments on the encoding specificity principle to check the generalisability of the concept. The first experiment focused on the normative strength go the cues presented on the encoding and recall of words and the second on the presence of weak cues in seconding and recall. The results of the experiments failed to support the encoding specificity principle as strong extra-list cues facilitated the recall of tbr words in the presence of weak encoded cues and recall of the original weak encoded cues failed to be recognised in the context of new strong cues.
