= Michael Howard (American actor) =

American actor, theatre director, and teacher (1923–2019)

- Born: Robert Horowitz; April 23, 1923; Manhattan, New York, U.S.
- Died: November 29, 2019 (aged 96); Brooklyn, New York, U.S.
- Occupations: Actor, director, master teacher
- Spouse: Betty Bartelt Howard
- Children: 2

Michael Howard (April 23, 1923 – November 29, 2019) was an American actor, theatre director, and master teacher. He founded Michael Howard Studios in New York City.

== Early years ==
Howard was born April 23, 1923, in New York City.

== Career ==
Howard began to study drama seriously at the Neighborhood Playhouse School of the Theatre, where his teachers included Martha Graham and Sanford Meisner. His professional acting debut came in Zero Hour. His acting career was interrupted by military service as a paratrooper during World War II, after which he helped to organize the American Forces Network in Berlin. Following his military service he "was instrumental in the off-Broadway movement" and was one of the founders of New Stages Incorporated. He worked as a director with the Theatre Guild and was a permanent member of the Director's Unit of the Actors Studio. In 1968 he became artistic director of the Atlanta Repertory Theater, and in 1969 he was named artistic director of the Alliance Resident Theater in Atlanta.

Howard's work on Broadway included performing in The Country Girl (1950) and staging Third Best Sport (1958).

Actors who have studied with Howard include Judy Kuhn, Laura Benanti, Julie Budd, Jacqueline Brookes, Linda Cook, Joan Darling, Keith David, Roger Davis, Cameron Douglas Jack Gilpin, James Hampton, Roxanne Hart, Polly Holliday, Mark Jacoby Michael Kahn, Nastassia Kinski, Ralph Lee, Stuart Margolin, Ernestine McClendon, Alexandra Neil Claudette Nevins, Carol Potter, Linda Powell, James Read, Diana Sands, Terry Schreiber Sandra Seacat, Valda Setterfield, Cornelia Sharpe, Jessica Tuck, and Kerry Washington.

== Personal life and death ==
Howard was married to Betty Bartelt, who predeceased him in 2016, aged 97. He died in Brooklyn, New York in November 2019 at the age of 96.
