= Sandra Seacat =

American actress, director and acting coach (1936–2023)

- Born: Sandra Diane Seacat; October 2, 1936; Greensburg, Kansas, U.S.
- Died: January 17, 2023 (aged 86); Santa Monica, California, U.S.
- Other names: Credited as Sandra Kaufman, her then-married name, before 1969
- Occupations: Acting teacher, actress, director
- Years active: 1962–2023
- Spouse(s): Arthur I. Kaufman (1959–1968/1969; divorced); Michael Ebert (19??–1978; divorced); Thurn Hoffman (1982–2023; her death)
- Children: 1

Sandra Diane Seacat (Note: Confusion about the spelling of Seacat's first name has arisen over the years, because of its counterintuitive pronunciation. Despite the conventional spelling, her name is properly pronounced somewhere between 'Sondra' and 'Saundra'; thus, on occasion, it has been misspelled accordingly, both in print and online.) (October 2, 1936 – January 17, 2023) was an American actress, director and acting coach best known for her innovations in acting pedagogy—blending elements of Strasberg, and Jungian dream analysis—and for a handful of coaching success stories.

== Early life and career ==
Seacat was the first of three daughters born to Russell Henry and Lois Marion Seacat in Greensburg, Kansas. Involved in theatre from her mid-teens on, Seacat first focused on method acting while attending Northwestern University, earning her degree and relocating to New York, where she studied with Actors Studio alumnus Michael Howard and later at the Studio with its director Lee Strasberg.

Seacat first attracted attention—as Sandra Kaufman, her then married name—in July 1962, in the Barnard-Columbia Summer Theater production of Somerset Maugham's The Noble Spaniard. Despite finding the play "rather silly,” Back Stage's reviewer "found particular pleasure in Sandra Kaufman's characterization." She appeared once more that summer, this time under Michael Howard's direction, in the US premiere of Leonid Andreyev's The Waltz of the Dogs. Amidst a generally favorable review, Back Stage reserved "bouquets" for Kaufman and 2 others, while The Village Voice predicted, “Miss Kaufman’s appetizing warmth [is] destined to bring many future stages alive.”

The following winter, an eventful few hours—attaining both Actors Studio membership and first-time motherhood—gave rise to roughly 2 years of seeming inactivity, a notable exception being Kaufman’s Broadway debut, a small part in the Actors Studio production of Chekhov’s Three Sisters. Her full-fledged return came on October 12, 1965, in Atlanta’s Community Playhouse (again under Howard’s direction), when, having beaten out Rosemary Forsyth for the title role in Shaw’s Saint Joan, Kaufman's portrayal was described by The Journal-Constitution as "a masterpiece of suave speech and faultless timing [which] enhances the lyrical quality of Shaw's lines." "Kaufman," it continues, "is both saint and genius; her portrayal leaves nothing to be desired."

After resuming her studies in New York, Kaufman again collaborated with her former teacher, along with Gene Hackman, Tom Aldredge and Chicago import Mina Kolb, to form the Second City Revue – a short-lived New York offshoot of the like-named Chicago-based improvisational troupe. On June 5, 1966, the ABC News series Directions '66 featured the group.

Between 1968 and 1970, Seacat (Note: Beginning in 1968 (when her first marriage ended in divorce), Seacat always worked under her maiden name.) appeared in regional theater in Toronto, Atlanta and New Orleans.

Under her married name, she lived in the gated Coney Island community of Sea Gate, Brooklyn.

== Teaching ==
During the 1970s, Seacat taught at the Lee Strasberg Theatre Institute, City College of New York's Leonard Davis Center for the Performing Arts, the Actors Studio, and she taught privately. Among her clients were Steve Railsback, Lance Henriksen, Christopher Reeve and Mickey Rourke, who later said of his time with Seacat, "That's when everything started to click."

Over the next decade, while teaching in New York and Los Angeles, Seacat was credited with a number of such breakthroughs, including those of Jessica Lange, Rachel Ward and Marlo Thomas. During this period, she also helped pioneer the practice of dream work, in which actors study and play characters from their dreams. Among those studying the technique was Seacat's daughter, Greta, who went on to become an acting coach. In addition, actresses Melanie Griffith and Gina Gershon publicly credited Seacat's use of the dream method with improving their craft.

Also attending those classes were future Songwriter's HOF inductee Desmond Child, then a self-professed "fly on the wall" alongside Lange, Rourke, Michelle Pfeiffer and others. Speaking in 2018 with Music & Musicians, he gratefully acknowledged Seacat's mentorship, noting the correlation between her early efforts at linking text to actor and Child's later knack for matching song to singer. Similarly, Child embraced Seacat's vision of the artist as a "wounded healer" and the audience "a co-creator [who] heals through that process." "As songwriters," Child concurred, "we have a sacred job to help them connect."

Acting teacher Alex Cole Taylor in 2010 told Backstage that Seacat taught him compassion for his students. In 2012, CNN's profile of acting coach Elizabeth Kemp coupled Seacat with Lee Strasberg as "legendary acting coaches." Longtime Seacat student Laura Dern, speaking at the January 2012 Golden Globe Awards presentation, thanked "Sandra Seacat, Frank Capra, Lucille Ball, [and] everybody who's ever inspired any of us" at the conclusion of her acceptance speech for Best Actress.

In 2012 and 2013, Seacat was a faculty member at the annual Film Forum hosted by the University of Arkansas's Winthrop Rockefeller Institute, organized by fellow Actors Studio alumnus Robert Walden.

While Seacat always shunned publicity, both for her own sake and that of her clients, she did go on record regarding a few of her more famously self-proclaimed students such as Jessica Lange, Mickey Rourke, Meg Ryan and, on multiple occasions, Laura Dern, whose longstanding relationship with Seacat is the subject of an article and the accompanying video published by The Hollywood Reporter in February 2015.

In February 2018, Seacat and her third husband, Thurn Hoffman, were featured among more than 20 couples seen in the music video for Night Things' cover of The Everly Brothers' 1959 hit "(Till) I Kissed You."

== Directing ==
Seacat directed one movie, In the Spirit, shot in 1988, released in April 1990, and starring Marlo Thomas and Elaine May. The year-plus gap between wrap and release saw one previously announced cast member, Louise Lasser, end on the cutting room floor, as well as the addition of what Variety later termed "the stupid framing device of a mystical narrator," presumably inserted in hopes of patching over rough spots in the narrative, in particular the dramatic shift in tone occurring midway through the film.

That any such hopes had gone unrealized was the general consensus amongst critics, who were nonetheless divided between those who found such flaws forgivable—such as The Boston Globe ("An Endearing Mess") or Hal Hinson of The Washington Post ("disjointed [but] deliciously addlebrained")—and those who did not, such as Janet Maslin, who dubbed In the Spirit "a nervous new-age comedy more notable for good intentions than good luck," and the Los Angeles Times, which noted that what begins as "a richly comic" vehicle for Ms. May abruptly "crumbles around her at roughly its halfway point." Variety, however, perceived a method to Spirit's messiness, "a throwback to the looser, madcap '60s," featuring "big name talent [working on] a low budget" to make a "pic freed of mainstream good taste and gloss."

In August 2007, Seacat, with Jamie Wollrab, directed her daughter, Greta Seacat, along with Shannon Woodward, Justin Chatwin and Johnny Lewis in Elizabeth Meriwether's play The Mistakes Madeline Made at the Dairy Center for the Arts in Boulder, Colorado.

== Personal life and death ==
Seacat married three times, the first two ending in divorce: to Arthur Kaufman, to actor Michael Ebert, and, from 1982 until her death, to Thurn Hoffman. She had a daughter by her first husband, acting coach Greta Seacat.

On January 17, 2023, at the age of 86, Seacat died in Santa Monica, California, of primary biliary cholangitis, an auto-immune disease. Predeceased by sister Sherrell Kay Seacat Heft in 2018, she was survived by her husband, her daughter, and sister Serena Seacat.

== Filmography ==
=== Film ===
Year	Title	Role
1975	Night Moves	Voice
1979	The Rose	Reporter
1980	The Kidnapping of the President	Henrietta Cown
1980	Jane Austen in Manhattan	Thriftshop Lady
1982	Frances	Drama Teacher
1983	The Golden Seal	Gladys
1984	Country	Louise Brewer
1987	Promised Land	Mrs Rivers
1988	Wildfire	Sissy
1990	In the Spirit	Director
1993	Born Yesterday	Thanks
1994	The New Age	Mary Netter
1996	The Destiny of Marty Fine	Woman on Beach
1998	The Baby Dance	Doreen
1999	Crazy in Alabama	Meemaw
2001	The Want	Doctor
2001	Nailed	Sandra the Midwife
2001	Daddy and Them	Elbe
2003	Prey for Rock & Roll	Mother
2003	In the Cut	Creative consultant
2003	A Little Crazy	Delphine
2004	In the Land of Milk and Money	Mrs. Trevors
2004	Illusion	The Boarding House Lady
2007	Fade	Woman
2007	Tattered Angel	Louise
2010	Sympathy for Delicious	Mrs. Matilda
2010	You Don't Know Jack	Janet Adkins
2012	Shale (short subject)	Sheila
2012	The Time Being	Annette
2013	Palo Alto	Tanya
2014	Alex of Venice	Sandra
2015	The Scarecrow (short subject)	Janine
2016	Buster's Mal Heart	Public Access Psychic
2017	The Strangeness You Feel (short subject)	Jane

=== Television ===
Year	Title	Role
1966	Directions '66 (TV series; one episode – 1966, 5 June)	Not available (as Sandra Kaufman)
1976	First Ladies Diaries: Edith Wilson (TV movie)	Helen
1978	"Fame" (Hallmark) (TV movie)	Bess
1986	Nobody's Child (TV movie)	Barbara
1991	Held Hostage: The Sis and Jerry Levin Story (TV movie)	NA
1994	Reunion (TV movie)	NA
1999	Mickey Rourke: The E! True Hollywood Story (TV documentary)	Herself
2000	Intimate Portrait: Laura Dern (TV series documentary)	Herself
2001	Biography: Jessica Lange, On Her Own Terms (TV series documentary)	Herself
2008	The Dark Side of Fame with Piers Morgan: Mickey Rourke (TV series documentary)	Herself
2011	Enlightened (TV series; two episodes – 2011, 10 and 17 October)	Patricia
2013	Enlightened (One episode – 2013, 27 January)	Patricia
2022	Under the Banner of Heaven (Starring role)	Josie Pyre

== Students of Sandra Seacat ==
- Tiana Alexandra
- Rosenna Arquette
- Kirk Baltz
- Mikhail Baryshnikov
- Lawrence Bender
- Lili Bordán
- Raoul Bova
- Josh Brolin
- Betty Buckley
- Nicolas Cage
- Hélène Cardona
- Reeve Carney
- Lynda Carter
- Justin Chatwin
- Desmond Child
- Scott Coffey
- Common
- Blythe Danner
- Robert Davi
- Loren Dean
- Rebecca DeMornay
- Johnny Depp
- Laura Dern
- Peter Dobson
- Tony Drazan
- Peter Falk
- Frances Fisher
- Joely Fisher
- Tricia Leigh Fisher
- Andrew Garfield
- Martha Gehman
- Gina Gershon
- Ryan Gosling
- Melanie Griffith
- Cornelia Guest
- Martin Henderson
- Lance Henriksen
- Tina Holmes
- Don Johnson
- Harvey Keitel
- Arfi Lamba
- Jessica Lange
- Peggy Lipton
- Melanie Mayron
- Tatum O'Neal
- Michelle Pfeiffer
- Chris Pine
- Steve Railsback
- Christopher Reeve
- Isabella Rossellini
- Mickey Rourke
- Meg Ryan
- Diane Salinger
- Ally Sheedy
- Brooke Shields
- Helen Slater
- Alex Cole Taylor
- Marlo Thomas
- Dov Tiefenbach
- Rosie Vela
- Rachel Ward
- Michelle Williams
- Treat Williams
- Stefano Zanchetti
