= Night Things =

Night Things may refer to:

- Night Things (Ronnie Milsap album), 1975
- Night Things (Ed Bruce album), 1986
- Night Things (band), a Los Angeles–based new wave band
