= State-dependent memory =

Psychological phenomenon

State-dependent memory or state-dependent learning is the phenomenon where people remember more information if their physical or mental state is the same at time of encoding and time of recall. State-dependent memory is heavily researched in regards to its employment both in regards to synthetic states of consciousness (such as under the effects of psychoactive drugs) as well as organic states of consciousness such as mood. While state-dependent memory may seem rather similar to context-dependent memory, context-dependent memory involves an individual's external environment and conditions (such as the room used for study and to take the test) while state-dependent memory applies to the individual's internal conditions (such as use of substances or mood).

== History of research ==
In 1784, a French aristocrat named Marquis de Puységur, realized that when people were put in a hypnotic state then awoken, they had no recollection of what they were told. However, when they were put back under hypnosis, in the state they would be able to recall everything from the last time.

In 1910, a man named Morton Prince came to a realization about dreams. He hypothesized that the reason we have a hard time remembering our dreams when we wake up is not due to the fact that we are unable to, but because dreams are not like the real world.

In 1937, at the University of Illinois, Edward Girden and Elmer Culler conducted an experiment on conditioned responses in dogs under the influence of the drug curare. In the experiment, dogs were taught a conditioned muscular response – to draw their paw away from the ground when they heard a buzzer. The buzzer was often accompanied by a small electric shock, which motivated the response. For dogs that had been under the influence of curare when they first learned the response, after the curare was no longer in their system, they were less likely to remember to draw their paw away on hearing the buzzer. Once they were given curare again, the response returned. This result indicated that the dogs' ability to recall the responses was connected to their state of consciousness. Girden and Culler's research opened the door for further investigation of the influences of state of consciousness on an organism's ability to encode memory.

Following this discovery, other researchers looked into the effect of different states of being on the ability to learn and remember responses or information. In 1964, Donald Overton conducted a study as a direct response to Girden and Culler's 1937 experiment. The study tested the effects of sodium pentobarbital on rats' abilities to learn and remember certain taught responses. These rats were randomly assigned to one of two groups – substance administered or no substance administered (the control condition) – and then placed in a simple maze and taught to escape an electrical shock. Overton found that the rats that had been administered 25 mg of sodium pentobarbital could no longer remember the proper escape response when they were later placed in the maze without the drug. However, if these rats were administered sodium pentobarbital once again and placed in the maze, they recalled the escape response they had been taught. Similarly, when Overton taught a rat the escape response under the control condition (no sodium pentobarbital administered), it could not recall that behavior when it was administered the drug and asked to perform later on. Results strongly indicated that rats performed the learned response more efficiently when in the either sodium pentobarbital or control state that they were in when they first learned it. In regard to this idea the study specifically stated "a response learned under the influence of a particular drug will subsequently reoccur (with maximum strength) only when that drug condition is reinstated".

In 1969, Hoine, Bremer, and Stern conducted a test with two main parts. The participants were given time to study and just before they were tested they were asked to consume 10 ounces of Vodka. The very next day they did the same thing except some were intoxicated, while others remained sober. The results found that whether the students were sober or intoxicated they did well, but only if the state they were in was the same when they studied and when they were tested. In other words if they were intoxicated while they studied, then they did better taking the test in the same state. If they were sober when they studied then they got their best results while sober.

In later years, similar studies confirmed that learning could be state-dependent. In 1971, Terry Devietti and Raymond Larson conducted a similar study in rats, seeing how memory was affected by various levels of electric shock. Their results supported the idea that the rats' ability to remember a learned response was influenced by their state. The phenomenon continued to be studied more than thirty years later. In 2004, Mohammad-Reza Zarrindast and Ameneh Rezayof studied mice, to see how memory and learning were affected by morphine. They found that when mice learned a response under the influence of morphine, they later performed it most efficiently under the influence of morphine. When mice learned the response free of morphine, they recalled it best when similarly sober. And for mice that were taught the response under the influence of morphine, once the drug wore off, they suffered amnestic effects; they could no longer remember the learned response.

The results of each of these studies points to the existence of a state-dependent memory phenomenon. Further research on the subject continues to be carried out today in order to discover further implications of state-dependent memory or other situations in which state-dependent memory might take place.

In 1979, Reus, Post, and Weingartner, found that when a person is depressed they find it nearly impossible to think of a time in the past when they were happy. The longer they were depressed the more impossible the task became. They attributed this to the mind taking control of how the person felt. The person feels nothing but misery so, therefore, that is what their whole life must have been like both before and after the depression to hold.

In 1999 a psychiatry journal was published on the topic of spouse abuse. The main topic of discussion was about men who would abuse their wives, sometimes even killing them and having no memory of the event afterward. At first they were just thought to be lies but with later findings they found that many convicts have said the same thing. They remember the time before the attack and after, but have no memory of the attack itself. One man described it as everything going red as though he had blacked out. In this journal it is discussed that state-dependent memory might be to blame. The thought process behind this theory is that the individuals experience what is known as limited amnesia. This form of amnesia is specific towards one event that has been forgotten. The idea is that the person got so mad/angry at their spouse that they cannot recall what they did because it is so out of character for them. This could be attributed to the person choosing not to remember and losing the memory or due to the alcohol that is usually consumed. [1]

In 2019 a study of 100 college-aged women between the age of 18–24 were given questionnaires daily to access how alcohol had an effect on their memories of a past sexual assault (SA). Some of the women were intoxicated during the assault and about half were not. Women who were intoxicated during the assaults would experience intrusive thoughts and flashbacks of the SA. Whereas, women who were not intoxicated at the time of their assault experienced no more flashbacks or intrusive thoughts than usual. It is common for alcohol to be attributed to forgetting, but when encoding happens specifically while under the influence of alcohol it can make the memory more vivid.

== Biological functions and explanatory mechanisms ==
At its most basic, state-dependent memory is the product of the strengthening of a particular synaptic pathway in the brain. A neural synapse is the space between brain cells, or neurons, that allows chemical signals to be passed from one neuron to another. Chemicals called neurotransmitters leave one cell, travel across the synapse, and are taken in by the next neuron through a neurotransmitter receptor. This creates a connection between the two neurons called a neural pathway. Memory relies on the strengthening of these neural pathways, associating one neuron with another. When we learn something, new pathways are made between neurons in the brain which then communicate through chemical signals. If these cells have a history of sending out certain signals under specific chemical conditions within the brain, they are then primed to work most effectively under similar circumstances. State-dependent memory happens when a new neural connection is made while the brain is in a specific chemical state – for instance, a child with ADHD learns their multiplication tables while on stimulant medication. Because their brain created these new connections related to multiplication tables while the brain was chemically affected by the stimulant medication, their neurons will be primed in the future to remember these facts best when the same levels of medication are present in the brain.

While there is strong evidence for the existence of state-dependent memory, it is less clear what the advantage of this circumstance might be. In 2006, researcher Lorena Pomplio and her team tackled this question as they investigated the presence of state-dependent memory in invertebrates, specifically grasshoppers. Up until this point, only vertebrates had been used to study state-dependent memory. This study found that invertebrates did indeed experience the phenomenon as well, particularly in regard to conditions of low or high nutritional intake. Pomplio and associates (2006) concluded that their results demonstrated a potential "adaptive advantage" of state-dependent learning that explains its intrinsic presence in such a wide variety of species. State-dependent memory recalls a time that the organism was in a similar condition, which then informs the decisions they make in the present. For these grasshoppers, their low nutritional state sparked cognitive connections to similar states of duress and primed the insects to make decisions they had made when faced with low nutrition in previous conditions. The paper suggests that this phenomenon allows for quick decisions to be made when an organism does not have the time or neural capability to carefully process every option.

== Substances ==
Research has shown evidence for the roles that numerous substances play in state-dependent memory. For example, stimulants like Ritalin can produce state-dependent memory effects in children with hyperactive disorders. Additionally, state-dependent memory effects have been found in regard to other substances such as morphine, caffeine, and alcohol.

Substantial amounts of research have been conducted on the effects of alcohol. A very clear description of state-dependent memory is found in John Elliotson's Human Physiology (1835):

"Dr. Abel informed me," says Mr. Combe [presumably George Combe], "of an Irish porter to a warehouse, who forgot, when sober, what he had done when drunk: but, being drunk, again recollected the transactions of his former state of intoxication. On one occasion, being drunk, he had lost a parcel of some value, and in his sober moments could give no account of it. Next time he was intoxicated, he recollected that he had left the parcel at a certain house, and there being no address on it, it had remained there safely, and was got on his calling for it." This man must have had two souls, one for his sober state, and one for him when drunk.

Research shows that individuals are less likely to remember information learned while intoxicated when they are once again sober. However, information learned or memories created while intoxicated are most effectively retrieved when the individual is in a similar state of intoxication.

Alcoholism can enhance state-dependent memory as well. In a study comparing the state-dependent memory effects of alcohol on both subjects with alcoholism and subjects without alcoholism, researchers found that the alcoholic subjects showed greater effects for state-dependent memory on tasks of recall and free association. This is not because alcohol better produces associations, but because the person with alcoholism lives a larger portion of their life under the influence of alcohol. This produces changes in cognition and so when the person with alcoholism drinks, the intoxication primes their brain towards certain associations made in similar states. Essentially, the intoxicated and sober states of the alcoholic are in fact, different from the intoxicated and sober states of the non-alcoholic person, whose body is not as used to processing such large amounts of the substance. For this reason, we see slightly larger effects of state-dependent memory while intoxicated for chronic drinkers than for those who do not drink often.

In contrast, studies show the lack of effects caffeine has on state-dependent memory. With subjects either consuming no beverage or a caffeinated coffee at time of memorizing a word list, and then undergoing the same treatment at recall, there was no significant difference between either group's ability to recall the memorized word list.

The effects of marijuana have shown unclear results regarding an individual's cognitive ability to recall information regardless of the state they were in while encoding or recalling. In a study, a wide array of subjects with varying levels of THC exposure were given a dosage of this compound and asked to perform tasks relating to memory function. The final results did not produce sufficient evidence to make a strong argument regarding cannabis and state dependent memory.

== Mood ==
It has been hypothesized throughout the years that intoxicated people do not remember what they did while they were drunk because they were in a state of euphoria. Whereas in day-to-day life the average person is not quite as happy. It is not until they become intoxicated again and reach that higher mood that they can begin to piece together what they did a few nights before.

State-dependent memory influenced by mood has been the subject of some controversy within the psychological field. Though research seemed to show evidence for the existence of mood-dependence in memory, this came into question later on when researchers suggested the results were actually the result of mood congruent memory, a phenomenon in which an individual recalls more information associated with their condition. For example, a person who is asked to learn a list of words while they have a cold might remember more words associated with their illness such as "tissue" or "congestion" when later asked to recall the words learned. Researchers have since been conducting experiments to unearth the truth about mood-dependent memory, though it remains difficult to completely eliminate unreliability from such studies.

Some studies have investigated the existence of mood-dependent memory, especially in individuals with bipolar disorder who generally vacillate over time between mood extremes, specifically depression and mania. In 1977, it was found that individuals with bipolar disorder performed better on a verbal association test when they were in a similar mood state to their state when the verbal associations were learned. A more recent study in 2011 similarly studied a group of individual with bipolar disorder and found evidence for mood-dependent memory on a visual task (recognition of inkblots). It was observed that subjects had better recall for these inkblots when they were in the same mood state they had been in when they first saw these inkblots. However, researchers did not find a similar effect for verbal tasks. Because the two studies do not agree on the effects of mood in regard to verbal recall tasks, further research is needed to clarify the existence of mood-dependent memory on both verbal and visual recall tasks as well as to investigate mood-dependent memory in those suffering from other mood disorders or individuals without mood disorders of any kind.

In 1979 a study was conducted on a man named Jonah who suffered from Multiple Personality Disorder. While asked a series of questions of various subject matter, it was not until he was asked personal and emotional questions that his alternate personalities seemed to surface. Each "personality" appeared to be completely distinct from the next. When the study was over and Jonah was asked what he remembered the day before, he could only remember the questions he was asked prior to the surfacing of his alternative personalities, before being asked emotionally saturated questions. While multiple personality disorder is a very complex subject aside from that of simply state dependent memory, it is possible that the varying levels of memory each personality experienced had some relationship with mood dependent memory.

== Pain ==
In an experiment, subjects were asked to memorize a list of words (some of which were pain related while others not), then either submerged their hand in warm or ice cold water. Subjects who underwent the pain of submerging their hand in ice water subsequently to memorizing the list demonstrated better recall of the words related to pain than their warm water counterparts (though it is worth mentioning that the warm-water group remembered more words from the list overall). This is one example of how state-dependent learning and memory is observed as the subjects who underwent the pain condition were better able to recall the memorized words relevant to such a condition.

It is hypothesized that state dependent memory which coincides with pain and trauma could yield negative cognitive results such as dissociative amnesia, or the inability to recall personal information that would not ordinarily be forgotten. It is thought that this disorder arises when a painful moment is misinterpreted or not allowed to be detached as time goes on. It is also theorized that this level of memory failure is attributed to overwhelming stress which then prevents an adequate integration of trauma relief mechanisms as well as the encoding of normal conscious experiences. Furthermore, the inability to perfectly recall such a traumatic memory yet still being fully affected by the trauma causes individuals to undergo a sort of cognitive relapse which could cause intense memory failure leading the individual to have huge gaps in the cognitive autobiographical memory. Other negative results regarding dissociative amnesia and state dependent memory include: anxiety, depression, social dysfunction, and psychosis. A study done on a sixty year old man whose house burned down showed these effects. After a series of therapeutical sessions, the patient experienced episodes of epilepsy and conveyed feelings of distress when given retrieval cues alluding to the house fire.

== Recreating internal state ==
Studies have shown that simply creating the same internal state that one had at the time of encoding is sufficient to serve as a retrieval cue. Therefore putting oneself in the same mindset as one experienced at the time of encoding will help recall in the same way that being in the same situation helps recall. This effect called context reinstatement was demonstrated by Fisher and Craik 1977 when they matched retrieval cues with the way information was memorized.

== Implications ==
State-dependent memory has widespread effects that can play roles in people's everyday lives. For example, state-dependence can affect performance on a test or in a job interview. However, the power of state-dependent memory can also be harnessed to improve performance in school for those with learning disabilities or outcomes in therapy.

State-dependent memory has implications on effectiveness of psychological treatment. Evidence has also been found for the idea that an individual's state (in regard to substance) can influence the impact of psychological treatment. Patients responded better to phobia exposure therapy from one treatment session to another when they were consistent in their states of consciousness. This study found that patients who had similar levels of caffeine in their system at each session or who consistently had no caffeine in their system exhibited greater rates of improvement with fewer phobia relapses than patients who came in at various states of caffeine influence from one treatment session to another. These results show that state-dependent learning can be used to the advantage of those undergoing psychological treatment. By remaining consistent in their state of consciousness during sessions, patients can improve the likelihood of their success and decrease the possibility of relapse. Future directions for this kind of research might test substances other than caffeine for similar effects on patient performance during psychological treatment.

Evidence for state-dependent learning has been found in children with hyperactivity taking the drug methylphenidate, a drug often prescribed for treatment of ADHD symptoms, more commonly known as Ritalin or Concerta. Children with hyperactivity taking this drug during periods of learning better retained that information during subsequent periods of methylphenidate use, illustrating the effectiveness of methylphenidate in facilitating learning in children diagnosed with hyperactive disorders. However, this state-dependent learning effect of stimulant medication applies only to children diagnosed with hyperactivity. Children not diagnosed with hyperactivity show no change in retention rates due to use of stimulants such as methylphenidate or pemoline. These studies validate the prescription of stimulants for individuals with hyperactive disorders. The results show that the state of consciousness produced through use of these drugs improves cognitive focus in those with hyperactive disorders when taken consistently.

== See also ==
- Altered states of consciousness – Any condition which is significantly different from a normal waking state
- Cognitive advantages to bilingualism – Overview multilingualism's effects on cognition
- Compartmentalization – Psychological defense mechanism
- Complex (psychology) – Core pattern of emotions, memories, perceptions, and desires
- Cue-dependent forgetting – Type of forgetting
- Effects of alcohol on memory – Health effect of alcohol consumption
- Hypnosis – State of increased suggestibility
- Splitting (psychology) – Failure to think in nuances
