= Michael Howard Studios =

Coordinates: 40.74496°N 73.99388°W

The Michael Howard Studios is an acting studio for the performing arts located in at 152 West 25th Street in Chelsea, Manhattan, New York City; the studio was founded in 1953 by actor/director Michael Howard.

== History ==
A protégé of both Sanford Meisner at the Neighborhood Playhouse and Lee Strasberg at the Actors Studio, Howard established his Studio in 1953 grounded in the work of Konstantin Stanislavski. Over the years, the studio incorporated many schools of thought and techniques from around the world.

The Studio attributes its existence to the Group Theatre. In 1931, Harold Clurman, Cheryl Crawford, and Strasberg founded the Group Theatre in New York, beginning a watershed period in American Theater. The Group Theatre brought together Elia Kazan, Stella Adler, Sanford Meisner, Frances Farmer, Clifford Odets, Irwin Shaw, and John Garfield (among many others). Their creative commune introduced America to the revolutionary teachings of Stanislavski, and it set in motion new schools of thought that would dominate acting for the rest of the century. The Group Theatre closed its doors in 1941, and its visionary members set out in new directions.

In 1942, Howard joined the Neighborhood Playhouse as a scholarship student under Sanford Meisner. Howard vigorously pursued his studies and absorbed everything Meisner had to impart. Howard then served in World War II as a parachutist, and upon returning, joined Equity in 1947. Strasberg invited Howard to study with him, and soon he was asked to become a member of the Actors Studio. Howard began a long career of hundreds of roles on stage and screen, including Odets' The Country Girl on Broadway and the film The Men with Marlon Brando. Acting led to directing and, in 1952, to teaching, when Sidney Lumet asked Howard to replace him at the High School of Performing Arts. The next year, in 1953, a group of actors asked Howard to lead their sessions, and Michael Howard Studios was born.

Over the next five decades, Howard's teachings expanded to the Yale School of Drama, the Juilliard School, the American Conservatory Theater, and Boston University while continuing his master classes at the Michael Howard Studios.
