= Alex Cole Taylor =

American actor

Alex Taylor is an American stage actor, writer and film/theatre director. He is the youngest surviving acting teacher to have worked with famed acting teacher Sanford Meisner, having been in the last class to work with Meisner before the latter's death in 1997.

Taylor attended Baylor University and studied with Sandra Seacat, coach to such actors as Johnny Depp, Jessica Lange, Meg Ryan and Mickey Rourke.

In 2008, Taylor co-founded the Sanford Meisner Studio in Burbank, California; the name was later changed to the Taylor School of Acting.

He has performed in over 60 theatrical productions. As a result of his stage work, Edward James Olmos invited him to participate in Marlon Brando's Lying for A Living where he worked with Marlon Brando, Sean Penn, Peter Coyote, Whoopi Goldberg, and Robin Williams.

Backstage magazine named the Taylor School of Acting as one of the top 5 acting schools to study at in Los Angeles.

He lives in Burbank, California with his wife and daughter. He also directs stage and film.
