= Ernestine McClendon =

American actress and first Black talent agent

- Born: Ernestine Epps; August 17, 1914; Norfolk, Virginia
- Died: September 23, 1991 (aged 77); Los Angeles, California
- Education: Columbia University
- Occupations: Actress, Activist, Talent Agent, Entrepreneur
- Spouse: George Wiltshire

Ernestine McClendon (1914 – 1991) was an American actress, comedian, activist, talent agent, and entrepreneur. She was the first Black talent agent in New York City, and the first talent agent to represent Black talent. Her career spanned the latter half of the 20th century.

== Early life ==
Ernestine McClendon was born Ernestine Epps in Norfolk, Virginia on August 17, 1914, to Edward E. Epps and Lillie Warren.

Epps was educated at Virginia State College, an HBCU. Then, from 1935 to 1936, she studied acting under Michael Howard at Columbia University. She married Horace McClendon in 1937, but was widowed shortly thereafter. Ernestine kept the surname McClendon for the rest of her life. She married her second husband, actor and comedian George Wiltshire, in the early 1950s. Together they adopted a daughter, Phyllis, born in 1948.

== Career in New York ==
McClendon had been acting since her time at Columbia University, but in 1950, she landed her first television role as Clementine on No Time for Comedy, and this launched her eighteen-year successful acting and comedy career. During the course of this career, she performed on television, in movies, and on stage in both on- and off-Broadway productions. Her very first comedy appearance was at the Apollo Theater in Harlem, alongside her husband and his partner, comedian Pigmeat Markham. She later made a guest appearance on the Ed Sullivan Show with Markham. In 1960, she played Lena Younger in a production of Lorraine Hansberry's A Raisin in the Sun.

Around 1960, McClendon noticed a crack in the unofficial ban on Black actors in advertising: a single television commercial that featured a Black actor. She decided to use that crack to her advantage and she began a one-woman letter writing campaign, targeting both acting agencies and product manufacturers, pushing them to hire Black actors for commercials. McClendon initially sent 100. Some of the responses she received expressed support for her efforts, adding they were not the persons responsible for casting commercials. She then sent 400 more letters.

McClendon's activism caught the attention of talent agent Lillian Arnold, who hired her to draw Black talent to Arnold's agency. From there, McClendon went on to manage actors of all races for Arnold's agency, and in 1963, she opened McClendon Enterprises. For much of the sixties, McClendon was a high-profile advocate for Black actors, placing clients in all kinds of roles including theater, television, movies, radio, and nightclubs.

McClendon was not only the first Black talent agent, and the first agent for Black talent; she was also the first woman in her field to be franchised by all four acting unions at the time—the American Guild of Variety Artists, the American Federation of Television and Radio Artists, Actors Equity, and the Screen Actors Guild—as a theatrical agent.

== Later life in Los Angeles ==
In 1971, McClendon was in a car accident that caused a lasting injury to her leg. Feeling that a more temperate climate would allow her less pain, the McClendon-Wiltshire family relocated to California. They opened a West Coast office of McClendon Enterprises, but were forced to close the New York office. McClendon went on to work with notable clients such as Raymond St. Jacques, Gloria Foster, Gail Fisher, and Morgan Freeman.

In 1980, McClendon closed her agency and returned to performing. She appeared in the television series Remington Steele and the mini-series Atlanta Child Murders; movies Homer and Eddie and Secret Agent 00 Soul; and made her debut as a stand-up comedian in 1984, at the age of 71.

On September 23, 1991, Ernestine McClendon died of cancer at Good Samaritan Hospital in Los Angeles, California, at the age of 77.
