= Sanford Meisner: The American Theatre's Best Kept Secret =

1990 documentary directed by Nick Doob

- Directed by: Nick Doob
- Produced by: Kent Paul; Sydney Pollack
- Cinematography: Nick Doob
- Edited by: Nick Doob
- Music by: Skip Kennon
- Production companies: Eagle Rock Entertainment; WNET Channel 13 New York
- Distributed by: Columbia Pictures Corporation; Public Broadcasting Service
- Release date: August 27, 1990 (U.S.)
- Running time: 60 min
- Country: United States

Sanford Meisner: The American Theatre's Best Kept Secret is a 1990 American documentary biography film directed by Nick Doob.

== Cast ==
- Susan Boehm
- Robert Duvall
- Peter Falk
- Bob Fosse
- Lee Grant
- Stephen Harvey as interviewer
- Anne Jackson
- Elia Kazan
- David Mamet
- Vivian Matalon
- Sanford Meisner
- Gregory Peck
- Suzanne Pleshette
- Sydney Pollack
- Tony Randall
- Mark Rydell
- José Angel Santana
- Mary Steenburgen
- Frances Sternhagen
- Gwen Verdon
- Jon Voight
- Eli Wallach
- Joanne Woodward
