= R v Leary =

Judgement of the Supreme Court of Canada

- Court: Supreme Court of Canada
- Decided: [1978] 1 S.C.R. 29
- Citation: [1978] 1 S.C.R. 29

Case history
- Subsequent actions: The "Leary rule" was later challenged in the case of R v Daviault, where an exception to the rule was made for when the accused was so intoxicated he was in a state akin to automatism.

Case opinions
- When the accused was found to be sufficiently intoxicated at the time of the offence to be unable to form the "minimal mental element" required for a general intent offence, they may still be held liable as the act of inducing intoxication can be substituted for the requirement of mens rea.

R v Leary, [1978] 1 S.C.R. 29, was the leading Supreme Court of Canada decision on the use of intoxication as an excuse to criminal liability which created what is known as the "Leary rule". The Court held that when the accused was found to be sufficiently intoxicated at the time of the offence to be unable to form the "minimal mental element" required for a general intent offence, they may still be held liable as the act of inducing intoxication can be substituted for the requirement of mens rea.

== Aftermath ==
The "Leary rule" was later challenged in the case of R v Daviault, where an exception to the rule was made for when the accused was so intoxicated he was in a state akin to automatism.

== See also ==
- List of Supreme Court of Canada cases
- R v George
