= R v George =

Judgement of the Supreme Court of Canada

R v George, 1960 S.C.R. 871 is a leading Supreme Court of Canada on different degrees of mens rea. The accused was acquitted for a specific intent offence of robbery as he was too intoxicated at the time. However, he was convicted of the general intent offence of assault.

Justice Fauteux famously described the distinction between general and specific intent offences:

In considering the question of mens rea, a distinction is to be made between (i) intention as applied to acts considered in relation to their purposes and (ii) intention as applied to acts considered apart from their purposes. A general intent attending the commission of an act is, in some cases, the only intent required to constitute the crime while, in others, there must be, in addition to that general intent, a specific intent attending the purpose for the commission of the act.

== See also ==
- List of Supreme Court of Canada cases
- R v Leary
