= Emotion and memory =

Critical factors contributing to the emotional enhancement effect on human memory

Emotion can have a powerful effect on humans and animals. Numerous studies have shown that the most vivid autobiographical memories tend to be of emotional events, which are likely to be recalled more often and with more clarity and detail than neutral events.

The activity of emotionally enhanced memory retention can be linked to human evolution; during early development, responsive behavior to environmental events would have progressed as a process of trial and error. Survival depended on behavioral patterns that were repeated or reinforced through life and death situations. Through evolution, this process of learning became genetically embedded in humans and all animal species in what is known as flight or fight instinct.

Artificially inducing this instinct through traumatic physical or emotional stimuli essentially creates the same physiological condition that heightens memory retention by exciting neuro-chemical activity affecting areas of the brain responsible for encoding and recalling memory. This memory-enhancing effect of emotion has been demonstrated in many laboratory studies, using stimuli ranging from words to pictures to narrated slide shows, as well as autobiographical memory studies. However, as described below, emotion does not always enhance memory.

== Arousal and valence in memory ==
One of the most common frameworks in the emotions field proposes that affective experiences are best characterized by two main dimensions: arousal and valence. The dimension of valence ranges from highly positive to highly negative, whereas the dimension of arousal ranges from calming or soothing to exciting or agitating.

The majority of studies to date have focused on the arousal dimension of emotion as the critical factor contributing to the emotional enhancement effect on memory. Different explanations have been offered for this effect, according to the different stages of memory formation and reconstruction. Memory has been shown to be better with arousal linked with emotion than without emotion. The use of a PET scan has allowed scientists to see that pictures with an "emotional-stimulus" have significantly larger amount of activity in the amygdala. In a study using fluoro-2-deoxyglucose (FDG-PET) to examine the brain during recall of films that were both neutral and aversive, there was a positive correlation between the brain glucose and metabolic rate in the amygdala. The activity in the amygdala is part of the episodic memory that was being created due to the adverse stimuli. Most recently, an intracranial EEG study found that the amygdala triggered more pronounced hippocampal sharp-wave ripples after the encoding of more arousing experiences, which are believed to play a critical role in memory consolidation.

However, a growing body of research is dedicated to the emotional valence dimension and its effects on memory. It has been claimed that this is an essential step towards a more complete understanding of emotion effects on memory. The studies that did investigate this dimension have found that emotional valence alone can enhance memory; that is, nonarousing items with positive or negative valence can be better remembered than neutral items.

=== Emotion and encoding ===
From an information processing perspective, encoding refers to the process of interpreting incoming stimuli and combining the processed information. At the encoding level the following mechanisms have been suggested as mediators of emotion effects on memory:

==== Selectivity of attention ====
Easterbrook's (1959) cue utilization theory predicted that high levels of arousal will lead to attention narrowing, defined as a decrease in the range of cues from the stimulus and its environment to which the organism is sensitive. According to this hypothesis, attention will be focused primarily on the arousing details (cues) of the stimulus, so that information central to the source of the emotional arousal will be encoded while peripheral details will not.

Accordingly, several studies have demonstrated that the presentation of emotionally-arousing stimuli (compared to neutral stimuli) results in enhanced memory for central details (details central to the appearance or meaning of the emotional stimuli) and impaired memory for peripheral details. Also consistent with this hypothesis are findings of weapon focus effect, in which witnesses to a crime remember the gun or knife in great detail but not other details such as the perpetrator's clothing or vehicle. In laboratory replications it was found that participants spend a disproportionate amount of time looking at a weapon in a scene, and this looking time is inversely related to the likelihood that individuals will subsequently identify the perpetrator of the crime. Other researchers have suggested arousal may also increase the duration of attentional focusing on the arousing stimuli, thus delaying the disengagement of attention from it. Ochsner (2000) summarized the different findings and suggested that by influencing attention selectivity and dwell time, arousing stimuli are more distinctively encoded, resulting in more accurate memory of those stimuli.

While these previous studies focused on how emotion affects memory for emotionally arousing stimuli, in their arousal-biased competition theory, Mather and Sutherland (2011) argue that how arousal influences memory for non-emotional stimuli depends on the priority of those stimuli at the time of the arousal. Arousal enhances perception and memory of high priority stimuli but impairs perception and memory of low priority stimuli. Priority can be determined by bottom-up salience or by top-down goals.

==== Prioritized processing ====
Emotional items also appear more likely to be processed when attention is limited, suggesting a facilitated or prioritized processing of emotional information. This effect was demonstrated using the attentional blink paradigm in which 2 target items are presented in close temporal proximity within a stream of rapidly presented stimuli.

The typical finding is that participants often miss the second target item, as if there were a "blink" of attention following the first target's presentation, reducing the likelihood that the second target stimulus is attended. However, when the second target stimulus elicits emotional arousal (a "taboo" word), participants are less likely to miss the target's presentation, which suggests that under conditions of limited attention, arousing items are more likely to be processed than neutral items.

Additional support for the prioritized processing hypothesis was provided by studies investigating the visual extinction deficit. People suffering from this deficit can perceive a single stimulus in either side visual field if it is presented alone but are unaware of the same stimulus in the visual field opposed to the lesional side, if another stimulus is presented simultaneously on the lesional side.

Emotion has been found to modulate the magnitude of the visual extinction deficit, so that items that signal emotional relevance (e.g., spiders) are more likely to be processed in the presence of competing distractors than nonemotional items (e.g., flowers).

=== Emotion and storage ===
In addition to its effects during the encoding phase, emotional arousal appears to increase the likelihood of memory consolidation during the retention (storage) stage of memory (the process of creating a permanent record of the encoded information). A number of studies show that over time, memories for neutral stimuli decrease but memories for arousing stimuli remain the same or improve.

Others have discovered that memory enhancements for emotional information tend to be greater after longer delays than after relatively short ones. This delayed effect is consistent with the proposal that emotionally-arousing memories are more likely to be converted into a relatively permanent trace, whereas memories for nonarousing events are more vulnerable to disruption.

A few studies have even found that emotionally arousing stimuli enhance memory only after a delay. The most famous of these was a study by Kleinsmith and Kaplan (1963) that found an advantage for numbers paired with arousing words over those paired with neutral words only at delayed test, but not at immediate test. As outlined by Mather (2007), the Kleinsmith and Kaplan effects were most likely due to a methodological confound. However, Sharot and Phelps (2004) found better recognition of arousing words over neutral words at a delayed test but not at an immediate test, supporting the notion that there is enhanced memory consolidation for arousing stimuli. According to these theories, different physiological systems, including those involved in the discharge of hormones believed to affect memory consolidation, become active during, and closely following, the occurrence of arousing events.

Another possible explanation for the findings of the emotional arousal delayed effect is post-event processing regarding the cause of the arousal. According to the post stimulus elaboration (PSE) hypothesis, an arousing emotional experience may cause more effort to be invested in elaboration of the experience, which would subsequently be processed at a deeper level than a neutral experience. Elaboration refers to the process of establishing links between newly-encountered information and previously-stored information.

It has long been known that when individuals process items in an elaborative fashion, such that meaning is extracted from items and inter-item associations are formed, memory is enhanced. Thus, if a person gives more thought to central details in an arousing event, memory for such information is likely to be enhanced. However, these processes could also disrupt consolidation of memories for peripheral details. Christianson (1992) suggested that the combined action of perceptual, attentional, and elaborative processing, triggered by an emotionally arousing experience, produces memory enhancements of details related to the emotion laden stimulus, at the cost of less elaboration and consolidation of memory for the peripheral details.

==== Emotion and elaboration ====
The processes involved in this enhancement may be distinct from those mediating the enhanced memory for arousing items. It has been suggested that in contrast to the relatively automatic attentional modulation of memory for arousing information, memory for non-arousing positive or negative stimuli may benefit instead from conscious encoding strategies, such as elaboration. This elaborative processing can be autobiographical or semantic.

Autobiographical elaboration is known to benefit memory by creating links between the processed stimuli, and the self, for example, deciding whether a word would describe the personal self. Memory formed through autobiographical elaboration is enhanced as compared to items processed for meaning, but not in relation to the self.

Since words such as "sorrow" or "comfort" may be more likely to be associated with autobiographical experiences or self-introspection than neutral words such as "shadow", autobiographical elaboration may explain the memory enhancement of non-arousing positive or negative items. Studies have shown that dividing attention at encoding decreases an individual's ability to utilize controlled encoding processes, such as autobiographical or semantic elaboration.

Thus, findings that participants' memory for negative non-arousing words suffers with divided attention, and that the memory advantage for negative, non-arousing words can be eliminated when participants encode items while simultaneously performing a secondary task, has supported the elaborative processing hypothesis as the mechanism responsible for memory enhancement for negative non-arousing words.

=== Emotion and retrieval ===
Retrieval is a process of reconstructing past experiences; this phenomenon of reconstruction is influenced by a number of different variables described below.

==== Trade-off between details ====
Kensinger argues there are two trade-offs: central/peripheral trade-off of details and a specific/general trade-off. Emotional memories may include increased emotional details often with the trade-off of excluding background information. Research has shown that this trade-off effect cannot be explained exclusively by overt attention (measured by eye-tracking directed to emotional items during encoding) (Steinmetz & Kensinger, 2013).

==== Contextual effects of emotion on memory ====
Contextual effects occur as a result of the degree of similarity between the encoding context and the retrieval context of an emotional dimension. The main findings are that the current mood we are in affects what is attended, encoded and ultimately retrieved, as reflected in two similar but subtly different effects: the mood congruence effect and mood-state dependent retrieval. Positive encoding contexts have been connected to activity in the right fusiform gyrus. Negative encoding contexts have been correlated to activity in the right amygdala (Lewis & Critchley, 2003). However, Lewis and Critchley (2003) claim that it is not clear whether involvement of the emotional system in encoding memory differs for positive or negative emotions, or whether moods at recall lead to activity in the corresponding positive or negative neural networks.

===== Mood congruence effect =====
The mood congruence effect refers to the tendency of individuals to retrieve information more easily when it has the same emotional content as their current emotional state. For instance, being in a depressed mood increases the tendency to remember negative events (Drace, 2013).

This effect has been demonstrated for explicit retrieval as well as implicit retrieval.

===== Mood-state dependent retrieval =====
Another documented phenomenon is the mood-state dependent retrieval, a type of context-dependent memory. The retrieval of information is more effective when the emotional state at the time of retrieval is similar to the emotional state at the time of encoding.

Thus, the probability of remembering an event can be enhanced by evoking the emotional state experienced during its initial processing. These two phenomena, the mood congruity effect, and mood-state dependent retrieval, are similar to the context effects which have been traditionally observed in memory research. It may also relate to the phenomena of state-dependent memory in neuropsychopharmacology.

When recalling a memory, if someone is recalling an event by themselves or within a group of people, the emotions that they remember may change as well recall of specific details. Individuals recall events with stronger negative emotions than when a group is recalling the same event. Collaborative recall, as it can be referred to, causes strong emotions to fade. Emotional tone changes as well, with a difference of individual or collaborative recall so much that an individual will keep the tone of what was previously felt, but the group will have a more neutral tone. For example, if someone is recalling the negative experience of taking a difficult exam, then they will talk in a negative tone. However, when the group is recalling taking the exam, they will most likely recount it in a positive tone as the negative emotions and tones fade. Detail recount is also something that changed based on the emotion state a person is in when they are remembering an event. If an event is being collaboratively recalled the specific detail count is higher than if an individual is doing it. Detail recall is also more accurate when someone is experiencing negative emotion; Xie and Zhang (2016) conducted a study in which participants saw a screen with five colors on it and when presented with the next screen were asked which color was missing. Those who were experiencing negative emotions were more precise than those in the positive and neutral conditions. Aside from emotional state, mental illness like depression relates to people's ability to recall specific details. Those who are depressed tend to overgeneralize their memories and are not able to remember as many specific details of any events as compared to those without depression.

==== Thematic vs. sudden appearance of emotional stimuli ====
A somewhat different contextual effect stemmed from the recently made distinction between thematical and sudden appearance of an emotionally arousing event, suggesting that the occurrence of memory impairments depends on the way the emotional stimuli are induced. Laney et al. (2003) argued that when arousal is induced thematically (i.e., not through the sudden appearance of a discrete shocking stimulus such as a weapon but rather through involvement in an unfolding event plot and empathy with the victim as his or her plight becomes increasingly apparent), memory enhancements of details central to the emotional stimulus need not come at the expense of memory impairment of peripheral details.

Laney et al. (2004) demonstrated this by using an audio narrative to give the presented slides either neutral or emotional meaning, instead of presenting shockingly salient visual stimuli. In one of the experiments, participants in both the neutral and emotional conditions viewed slides of a date scenario of a woman and man at a dinner date. The couple engaged in conversation, then, at the end of the evening, embraced. The event concluded with the man leaving and the woman phoning a friend.

The accompanying audio recording informed participants in the neutral condition that the date went reasonably well, while participants in the emotional condition heard that, as the evening wore on, the man displayed some increasingly unpleasant traits of a type that was derogatory to women, and the embrace at the end of the evening was described as an attempt to sexually assault the woman.

As expected, the results revealed that details central to the event were remembered more accurately when that event was emotional than when neutral, However, this was not at the expense of memory for peripheral (in this case, spatially peripheral or plot-irrelevant) details, which were also remembered more accurately when the event was emotional. Based on these findings it has been suggested that the dual enhancing and impairing effects on memory are not an inevitable consequence of emotional arousal.

== Neurobiological mechanisms of emotional memory enhancement ==
The neural mechanism underlying emotional memory enhancement involves the interaction between the amygdala and the hippocampus, as well as several other factors that prioritize the encoding of emotional experiences. When an emotional experience occurs, the amygdala becomes highly active, signaling the hippocampus to strengthen the encoding and consolidation of these memories. This process is facilitated by the release of stress hormones and neurotransmitters, which modulate synaptic plasticity and enhance neural connectivity. Multiple mechanisms have been proposed to explain this prioritized encoding, including the neuromodulatory effects on plasticity and the dynamic interplay between the amygdala and the hippocampus. Intracranial EEG studies have shown that the amygdala triggers pronounced hippocampal sharp-wave ripples after encoding emotional experiences, further reinforcing the consolidation of these memories during both awake and sleep. This coordinated activity between the amygdala and hippocampus ensures that emotionally significant events are prioritized in long-term memory storage, leveraging both immediate neurochemical changes and enduring structural adaptations in neural circuits.

== Memory of felt emotion ==
Many researchers use self-report measures of felt emotion as a manipulation check. This raises an interesting question and a possible methodological weakness: are people always accurate when they recall how they felt in the past? Several findings suggest this is not the case. For instance, in a study of memory for emotions in supporters of former U.S. presidential candidate Ross Perot, supporters were asked to describe their initial emotional reactions after Perot's unexpected withdrawal in July 1992 and again after the presidential election that November.

Between the two assessment periods, the views of many supporters changed dramatically as Perot re-entered the race in October and received nearly a fifth of the popular vote. The results showed that supporters recalled their past emotions as having been more consistent with their current appraisals of Perot than they actually were.

Another study found that people's memories for how distressed they felt when they learned of the 9/11 terrorist attacks changed over time and moreover, were predicted by their current appraisals of the impact of the attacks (Levine et al., 2004). It appears that memories of past emotional responses are not always accurate, and can even be partially reconstructed based on their current appraisal of events.

Studies have shown that as episodic memory becomes less accessible over time, the reliance on semantic memory to remember past emotions increases. In one study Levine et al. (2009) primes of the cultural belief of women being more emotional than men had a greater effect on responses for older memories compared to new memories. The long-term recall of emotions was more in line with the primed opinions, showing that long-term recall of emotions was heavily influenced by current opinions.

== Emotion regulation effects on memory ==
An interesting issue in the study of the emotion-memory relationship is whether our emotions are influenced by our behavioral reaction to them, and whether this reaction—in the form of expression or suppression of the emotion—might affect what we remember about an event. Researchers have begun to examine whether concealing feelings influences our ability to perform common cognitive tasks, such as forming memories, and found that the emotion regulation efforts do have cognitive consequences. In the seminal work on negative affect arousal and white noise, Seidner found support for the existence of a negative affect arousal mechanism through observations regarding the devaluation of speakers from other ethnic origins."

In a study of Richards and Gross (1999) and Tiwari (2013), participants viewed slides of injured men that produced increases in negative emotions, while information concerning each man was presented orally with his slide. The participants were assigned to either an expressive suppression group (where they were asked to refrain from showing emotion while watching the slides) or to a control group (where they were not given regulatory instructions at all). As predicted by the researchers, suppressors showed significantly worse performance on a memory test for the orally presented information.

In another study, it was investigated whether expressive suppression (i.e., keeping one's emotions subdued) comes with a cognitive price. They measured expressive suppression when it spontaneously occurred while watching a movie of surgeries. After the movie, memory was tested and was found to be worse with a higher usage of suppression. In a second study, another movie was shown of people arguing. Memory of the conversation was then measured. When gauging the magnitude of cognitive cost, expressive suppression was compared with self-distraction, which was described as simply not trying to think about something. It was concluded that experimentally-induced suppression was associated with worse memory.

There is evidence that emotion enhances memory but is more specific towards arousal and valence factors. To test this theory, arousal and valence were assessed for over 2,820 words. Both negative and positive stimuli were remembered higher than neutral stimuli. Arousal also did not predict recognition memory. In this study, the importance of stimulus controls and experimental designs in research memory was highlighted. Arousal-related activities when affiliated with heightened heart rate (HR) stimulate prediction of memory enhancement. It was hypothesized that tonic elevations in HR (meaning revitalization in HR) and phasic HR (meaning quick reaction) declaration to help the memory. Fifty-three men's heart rates were measured while looking at unpleasant, neutral, and pleasant pictures and their memory tested two days later. It was concluded that tonic elevations created more accurate memory recall.

Several related studies have reached similar results. It was demonstrated that the effects of expressive suppression on memory generalize to emotionally positive experiences and to socially relevant contexts.

One possible answer to the question "why does emotion suppression impair memory?" might lay in the self monitoring efforts invested in order to suppress emotion (thinking about the behavior one is trying to control). A recent study found heightened self- monitoring efforts among suppressors relative to control participants.

That is, suppressors were more likely to report thinking about their behavior and the need to control it during a conversation. Increases in self-monitoring predicted decreases in memory for what was said, that is, people who reported thinking a lot about controlling their behavior had particularly impoverished memories. However, additional research is needed to confirm whether self-monitoring actually exerts a causal effect on memory

== Emotion-induced forgetting ==
Emotionally arousing stimuli can lead to retrograde amnesia for preceding events and anterograde amnesia for subsequent events. This has been demonstrated in lab studies with lists of words or pictures, in which people show impaired memory for stimuli appearing before or after arousing stimuli.

== Depression and memory ==
Memory recall tends to be congruent with one's current mood, with depressed people more likely to recall negative events from the past. In addition, depression is often associated with poor memory in general, as outlined here.

== Dementia and emotional memory ==
Several studies have demonstrated emotional memory enhancement in Alzheimer's patients suggesting that emotional memory enhancement might be used in the daily management of Alzheimer's patients. One study found that objects are recalled significantly better in Alzheimer's patients if they were presented as birthday presents to AD patients.

== Aging and emotional memory ==
The enhancing effects of emotional arousal on later memory recall tend to be maintained among older adults and the amygdala shows relatively less decline than many other brain regions. However, older adults also show somewhat of a shift towards favoring positive over negative information in memory, leading to a positivity effect.

== Emotional memory and sleep ==
Emotional memory and sleep has been a well-researched association. Emotional memories are consolidated greater during sleep, rather than neutral memories. Studies have investigated high valence and arousing words, in comparison to neutral words. Sleep enhances the consolidation of the high valence and arousing words and therefore these are remembered more post-sleep. This concept has been demonstrated in many studies using a variety of media such as pictures, film clips, and words.

Memories of 'future relevance' are also consolidated greater during sleep. In a study by Wilhelm et al., 2011, memories of items that participants knew were needed for the future (for the testing session) were remembered more after sleep. Sleep consolidated these memories of future relevance to a greater extent. Memories that are emotionally significant and relevant for the future are therefore preferentially consolidated during sleep. This can translate to mean that memories that are more meaningful or valuable to a person are consolidated more.

The concept of emotional memory and sleep can be applied to real-life situations e.g. by developing more effective learning strategies. One could integrate the memorization of information that possesses high emotional significance (highly salient) with information that holds little emotional significance (low salience), prior to a period of sleep.

== See also ==
- Memory inhibition
- Effects of stress on memory
- Affective memory
- Amygdala
- Arousal
- Dispositional affect
- Emotions in decision making
- Exceptional memory
- Flashbulb memory
- Law of effect
- Memory and aging
- Mood-dependent memory
- Nostalgia
- Peak–end rule
- Rosy retrospection
- Yerkes-Dodson law
- Psychogenic amnesia; Dissociative Amnesia (formerly Psychogenic Amnesia) (DSM-IV Dissociative Disorders 300.12)

== Notes and references ==
- Drace, S (2013). "Evidence for the role of affect in mood congruent recall of autobiographic memories". Motivation & Emotion. 37 (3): 623–628. doi:10.1007/s11031-012-9322-5. S2CID 145403018.
- Erk, S.; Kiefer, M.; Grothe, J.; Wunderlich, A. P.; Spitzer, M.; Walter, H. (2003). "Emotional context modulates subsequent memory effect". NeuroImage. 18 (2): 439–447. doi:10.1016/s1053-8119(02)00015-0. PMID 12595197. S2CID 42526060.
- Lewis, P. A.; Critchley, H. D. (2003). "Mood-dependent memory". Trends in Cognitive Sciences. 7 (10): 431–433. doi:10.1016/j.tics.2003.08.005. PMID 14550485. S2CID 5926387.
- Long, N. M.; Danoff, M. S.; Kahana, M. J. (2015). "Recall dynamics reveal the retrieval of emotional context". Psychonomic Bulletin & Review. 22 (5): 1328–1333. doi:10.3758/s13423-014-0791-2. PMC 4547905. PMID 25604771.
- Steinmetz, K. M.; Kensinger, E. A. (2013). "The emotion-induced memory trade-off: More than an effect of overt attention?". Memory & Cognition. 41 (1): 69–81. doi:10.3758/s13421-012-0247-8. PMID 22948959.
