= Sanford Meisner =

American actor and acting teacher (1905–1997)

- Born: August 31, 1905; New York City, U.S.
- Died: February 2, 1997 (aged 91); Sherman Oaks, Los Angeles, California, U.S.
- Other name: Sandy
- Occupations: Actor; acting teacher
- Years active: 1924–1997
- Spouses: Peggy Meredith (m. 1948; div. 1950); Betty Gooch (divorced)
- Partner: James Carville

Sanford Meisner (August 31, 1905 – February 2, 1997) was an American actor and acting teacher who developed an approach to acting instruction known as the Meisner technique. While Meisner was exposed to method acting at the Group Theatre, his approach differed markedly in that he completely abandoned the use of affective memory, a distinct characteristic of method acting. Meisner maintained an emphasis on "the reality of doing", which was the foundation of his approach.

== Early life ==
Born in Brooklyn, New York City, Meisner was the oldest child of Hermann Meisner, a furrier, and Bertha Knoepfler, both Jewish immigrants who came to the United States from Hungary. His younger siblings were Jacob, Ruth, and Robert. To improve Sanford's health during his youth, his family took a trip to the Catskills. While there, however, his brother Jacob contracted bovine tuberculosis from drinking unpasteurized milk and died shortly thereafter. In an interview many years later, Meisner described this event as "the dominant emotional influence in my life from which I have never, after all these years, escaped." Because he was unable to cope with feelings of guilt relating to his brother's death, for which his parents blamed him, the young Meisner became isolated and withdrawn.

He found release in playing the family piano and eventually attended the Damrosch Institute of Music (now the Juilliard School), where he studied to become a concert pianist. When the Great Depression hit, however, his father pulled him out of music school to help with the family business in New York City's Garment District. Meisner later recalled that his only means of enduring long days spent lugging bolts of fabric was to entertain himself by replaying, in his mind, all the classical piano pieces he had studied in music school. Meisner believed this experience helped him develop, at age twenty, an acute sense of sound akin to perfect pitch. Later, as an acting teacher, he often evaluated his students' scene work with his eyes closed and his head dramatically buried in his hands. This trick was only partly for effect, he explained, because it actually helped him more closely listen to his student's work and pinpoint the true and false moments in their acting.

After graduating from Erasmus Hall High School in 1923, Meisner professionally pursued acting, which had interested him since his youth. He had acted at the Lower East Side's Chrystie Street Settlement House under the direction of Lee Strasberg, who would play an important role in his development. At age 19 Meisner heard that the Theatre Guild was hiring teenagers and, after a brief interview, was hired as an extra for They Knew What They Wanted. The experience deeply affected him, leading to the realization that acting had always been his life's ambition. He and Strasberg both appeared in the original Theatre Guild production of the Rodgers and Hart revue The Garrick Gaieties, from which the song "Manhattan" came.

== Group Theatre ==
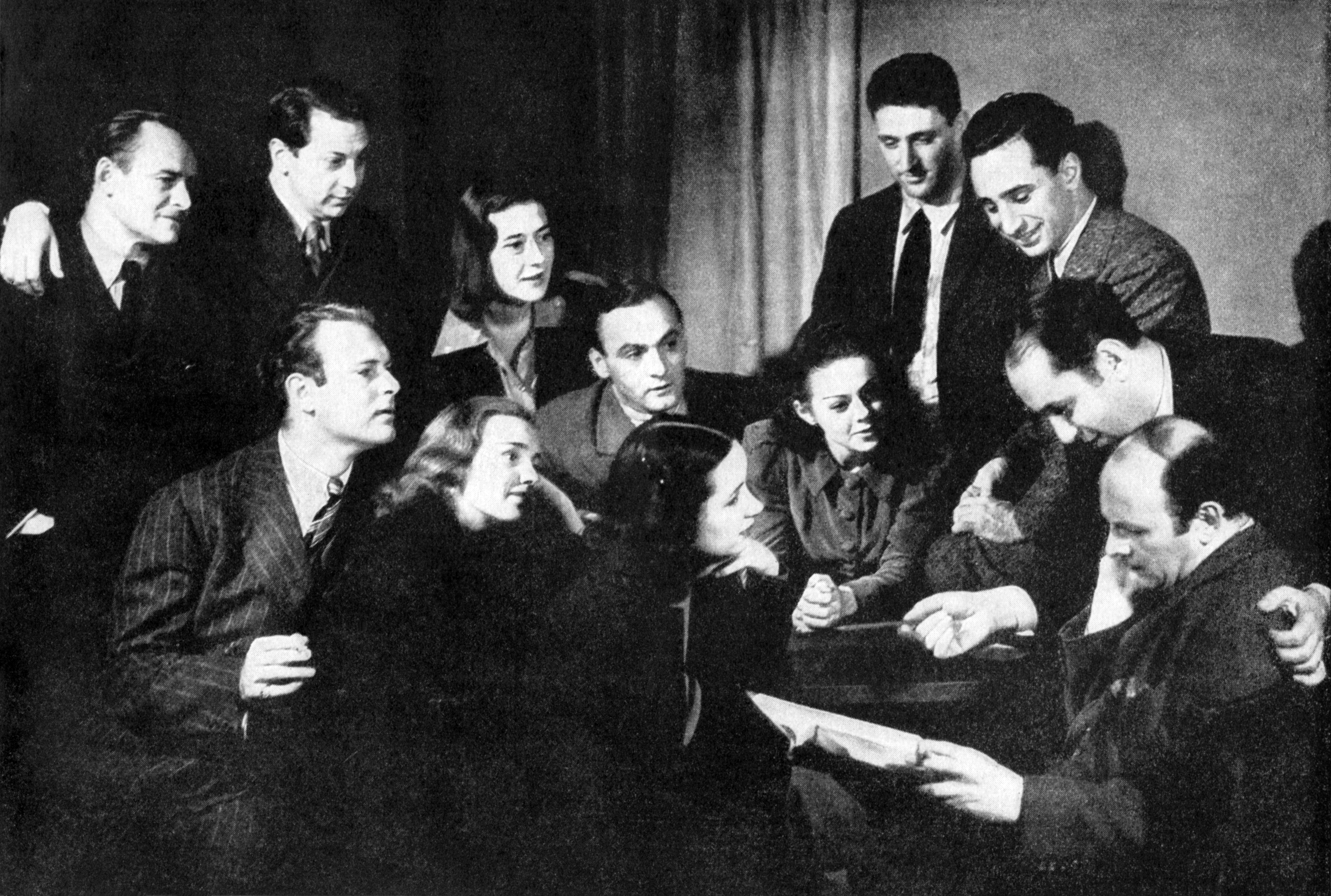
Sanford Meisner (back row center) with members of the Group Theatre in 1938

Despite his parents' misgivings, Meisner continued to pursue a career in acting, receiving a scholarship to study at the Theatre Guild of Acting. Here he encountered once again Harold Clurman and Lee Strasberg. Strasberg was to become another of the century's most influential acting theorists and the father of method acting, an acting technique derived, like Meisner's own, from the system of Konstantin Stanislavski. The three became friends. In 1931, Clurman, Strasberg, and Cheryl Crawford (another Theatre Guild member) selected 28 actors (one of whom was Meisner) to form the Group Theatre. This company exerted an influence on the entire art of acting in the United States. Meisner summered with the Group Theatre at their 1936 rehearsal headquarters at Pine Brook Country Club in the countryside of Nichols, Connecticut.

Meisner, along with a number of other actors in the company, eventually resisted Strasberg's preoccupation with affective memory exercises. In 1934, fellow company member Stella Adler returned from private study with Stanislavski in Paris and announced that Stanislavski had come to believe that, as part of a rehearsal process, delving into one's past memories as a source of emotion was only a last resort and that the actor should seek rather to develop the character's thoughts and feelings through physical action, a concentrated use of the imagination, and a belief in the "given circumstances" of the text. As a result, Meisner began to focus on a new approach to the art of acting.

When the Group Theatre disbanded in 1940, Meisner continued as head of the acting program at the Neighborhood Playhouse in New York, at which he had taught since 1935. In teaching he found a level of fulfillment similar to that which he had found in playing the piano as a child. At the Playhouse he developed his own form of method acting that was based on Stanislavski's system, Meisner's training with Lee Strasberg, and on Stella Adler's revelations about the uses of the imagination. Today that approach is called the Meisner technique. It was during these early years at The Neighborhood Playhouse that Meisner was briefly married to the young actress Peggy Meredith, who appeared in several Broadway productions.

The Actors Studio was founded in 1947 by two ex-Group Theatre actors Elia Kazan and Robert Lewis, and Cheryl Crawford. Strasberg initially had not been asked to join the group, while Meisner was among the first instructors to teach at the studio. However, by 1951, after Kazan moved to Hollywood to focus on his directorial career, Strasberg became the group's artistic director. In the following years, many students of the Actors Studio became well known in the film industry. Strasberg's later insistence that he had trained them distressed Meisner enormously, creating an animosity with his ex-mentor that continued until Strasberg's death.

== Neighborhood Playhouse School of the Theatre ==
In 1935, Meisner joined the faculty of The Neighborhood Playhouse School of the Theatre and continued as the Director of the Acting Department until his retirement in 1990, and served as Director Emeritus until his death in 1997. In 1928, The Neighborhood Playhouse School of the Theatre opened its doors. The first class of only nine students had the privilege of being taught by theatre luminaries Martha Graham, Louis Horst, Laura Elliott, and Agnes de Mille. Over his years of teaching at the Playhouse, this founding member of The Group Theatre developed and refined what is now known as the Meisner Technique: "To live truthfully under given imaginary circumstances." The Meisner Technique is a step-by-step procedure of self-investigation for the actor now widely recognized as one of the foremost acting techniques taught today.

Notable students and alumni of The Neighborhood Playhouse under Sanford Meisner's instruction include: Dylan McDermott, James Caan, Steve McQueen, Robert Duvall, Gregory Peck, Diane Keaton, Jeff Goldblum, Tony Randall, Sydney Pollack, David Mamet, Connie Britton, Brian Geraghty, Leslie Moonves, Sherie Rene Scott, Chris Noth, Tucker Smallwood, Mary Steenburgen, Betsy von Furstenberg, Allison Janney, Jennifer Grey, Ashlie Atkinson, Christopher Meloni, Alex Cole Taylor, and many more.

== Meisner/Carville School of Acting ==
In 1983, Meisner and his life partner James Carville founded the Meisner/Carville School of Acting on the Caribbean island of Bequia. Students from all around the world came every summer to participate in a summer intensive with Meisner. The Meisner/Carville School of Acting operated on the island and, beginning in 1985, also in North Hollywood. Meisner split his time between the Neighborhood Playhouse in New York and the two school locations. In spring of 1995, The Meisner/Carville School of acting was then succeeded by The Sanford Meisner Center for the Arts, a theater company and school in North Hollywood established by Meisner, James Carville, and Martin Barter. Graduates from Meisner's 2-year program could audition for the company. The company became a fixture on the Los Angeles theater scene for several years after Meisner's death. Meisner attended every rehearsal and every performance until the very end.

=== Notable students ===
Throughout his career, Meisner worked with, and taught, students who became well known. Sydney Pollack and Charles E. Conrad served as Meisner's senior assistants. The technique is helpful not just for actors, but also for directors, writers, and teachers. A number of directors also studied with him, among them Sidney Lumet and John Frankenheimer, and writers such as Arthur Miller and David Mamet. At least 37 of the students who studied with Sanford Meisner were nominated for or won Academy Awards.

==== List of notable students ====
- Joan Allen
- Sean Astin
- Alec Baldwin
- Roger Bart
- Susan Blakely
- Jeff Bridges
- Connie Britton
- Sandra Bullock
- Ty Burrell
- James Caan
- Scott Caan
- June Carter Cash
- Crystal Chappell
- Stephen Colbert
- Tom Cruise
- Alexandra Daddario
- James Doohan
- Illeana Douglas
- David Duchovny
- Robert Duvall
- Aaron Eckhart
- Noah Emmerich
- Peter Falk
- Peggy Feury
- Tina Fey
- Bob Fosse
- James Franco
- Eileen Fulton
- James Gandolfini
- Jeff Goldblum
- Lee Grant
- Diane Keaton
- Grace Kelly
- Louise Lasser
- Christopher Lloyd
- Jack Lord
- Dylan McDermott
- Steve McQueen
- Christopher Meloni
- Leslie Nielsen
- Renee O'Connor
- Gregory Peck
- Michelle Pfeiffer
- Suzanne Pleshette
- Sydney Pollack
- Jason Priestley
- Tony Randall
- David Rasche
- Krysten Ritter
- Mark Rydell
- Sherie Rene Scott
- Jennifer Sky
- Paul Sorvino
- Mary Steenburgen
- Frances Sternhagen
- Terry Stone
- John Turturro
- Karl Urban
- Jon Voight
- Eli Wallach
- Jessica Walter
- Christoph Waltz
- Naomi Watts
- Wil Wheaton
- Michael K. Williams

== Film and television appearances ==
Though he rarely appeared on film, he performed in Tender Is the Night, The Story on Page One, and Mikey and Nicky. His last acting role was in the season one episode of the television medical drama ER, titled "Sleepless in Chicago", where he worked with actor Noah Wyle.

Year	Title	Role	Notes
1959	The Story on Page One	Phil Stanley	
1962	Tender Is the Night	Dr. Franz Gregorovious	
1976	Mikey and Nicky	Dave Resnick	

== Author ==
Meisner is the author of the book Sanford Meisner on Acting (Knopf Doubleday 1987), considered by some to be an indispensable tool for contemporary actors.

== Personal life and death ==
Meisner's two marriages, to Peggy Meredith (née Meyer) and Betty Gooch, respectively, ended in divorce. Meisner, who was bisexual, spent the remainder of his life with partner James Carville.

In 1970 Meisner was diagnosed with throat cancer and underwent a laryngectomy. After that operation he lived for nearly three more decades, until February 2, 1997, when he died in his sleep at the age of 91 at his home in Sherman Oaks, Los Angeles.

== The Meisner technique ==
Meisner's unusual techniques were considered both unorthodox and effective. Actor Dennis Longwell wrote of sitting in on one of Meisner's classes one day, when Meisner brought two students forward for an acting exercise. They were given a single line of dialogue, told to turn away, and instructed not to do or say anything until something happened to make them say the words (one of the fundamental principles of the Meisner technique). The first student's line came when Meisner approached him from behind and gave him a strong pinch on the back, inspiring him to jump away and yelp his line in pain. The other student's line came when Meisner reached around and slipped his hand into her blouse. Her line came out as a giggle as she moved away from his touch.

The goal of the Meisner technique has often been described as getting actors to "live truthfully under imaginary circumstances."

== See also ==
- Ion Cojar (1931–2009), Romanian acting teacher
- Sanford Meisner: The American Theatre's Best Kept Secret, 1990 documentary

== Sources ==
- Carville, James; Trost, Scott (2017). De Tree a We, The Remarkable Lives of Sanford Meisner, James Carville & Boolu. Los Angeles: GR8 Books. ISBN 978-09993327-9-5.
- Jackson, Kenneth T., ed. 2002. The Scribner Encyclopedia of American Lives. Vol. 5. [S.l.]: Gale Group. ISBN 978-0-684-80663-1.
- Krasner, David (2000). "Strasberg, Adler and Meisner: Method Acting". In Hodge, Alison (ed.). Twentieth Century Actor Training. London and New York: Routledge. pp. 129–150. ISBN 0-415-19452-0.
- Longwell, Dennis; Meisner, Sanford (1987). Sanford Meisner on Acting. New York: Random House. ISBN 978-0-394-75059-0.
- Postlewait, Thomas (1998). "Meisner, Sanford". In Banham, Martin (ed.). The Cambridge Guide to Theatre. Cambridge: Cambridge University Press. p. 719. ISBN 0-521-43437-8.
- Silverberg, Larry (1994). The Sanford Meisner Approach: An Actor's Workbook – Workbook One. New Hampshire: Smith and Kraus. ISBN 978-1-880399-77-4.
