= Mood-dependent memory =

Mood dependence is the facilitation of memory when mood at retrieval is identical to the mood at encoding. When one encodes a memory, they not only record sensory data (such as visual or auditory data), they also store their mood and emotional states. An individual's present mood thus affects the memories that are most easily available to them, such that when they are in a good mood they recall good memories (and vice versa). The associative nature of memory also means that one tends to store happy memories in a linked set. Unlike mood-congruent memory, mood-dependent memory occurs when one's current mood resembles their mood at the time of memory storage, which helps to recall the memory. Thus, the likelihood of remembering an event is higher when encoding and recall moods match up. However, it seems that only authentic moods have the power to produce these mood-dependent effects.

== Theories of emotion ==
Mood is the state or quality of feeling at a particular time. When attempting to discover the biological factors that influence mood, it is difficult to find scientific proofs. The psychological study of mood is built on theories. However, much has been discovered in the study of the brain. The following are a few theories and areas of study of the mind used to further our knowledge of the mind.

=== Somatic theories ===
See also Somatic theories

Somatic theories of emotion claim that bodily responses are essential to emotions, rather than judgements. In the 1880s, William James provided the first modern version of such theories. The James–Lange theory, seen by many as his masterwork, lost favor in the 20th century, but has regained popularity more recently due largely to theorists such as John Cacioppo, António Damásio, Joseph E. LeDoux and Robert Zajonc who are able to appeal to neurological evidence. The James-Lange theory states that “Subjective emotions are the effect, not the cause, of the physiological manifestations of those emotions.”

=== Neurobiological theories ===
See also Neurobiological theories

Based on discoveries made through neural mapping of the limbic system, the neurobiological explanation of human emotion is that emotion is a pleasant or unpleasant mental state organized in the limbic system of the mammalian brain. If distinguished from reactive responses of reptiles, emotions would then be mammalian elaborations of general vertebrate arousal patterns, in which neurochemicals (for example, dopamine, noradrenaline, and serotonin) step-up or step-down the brain's activity level, as visible in body movements, gestures, and postures. This hypothesis that synaptic plasticity is an important part of the neural mechanisms underlying learning and memory is now widely accepted.

=== Cognitive theories ===
See also Cognitive theories

In cognitive psychology, the human mind is seen to be a structured system for handling information. Several theories argue that cognitive activities such as judgments, evaluations, or thoughts are necessary for an emotion to occur. Richard Lazarus argues this by saying it is necessary to capture the fact that emotions are about something or have intentionality. Such cognitive activity may be conscious or unconscious and may or may not take the form of conceptual processing.

Written in 1958, Donald Eric Broadbent's Perception and Communication was the first book entirely devoted to human information processing. This book introduced the notion of several distinct kinds of storage systems (memories) of limited capacity and of attention as a mechanism for filtering incoming information.

== Internal versus external events ==
Internal events occur in the human mind. These occurrences of cognition are visible only to the person who experiences them. External events are physical occurrences experienced in a human's environment, such as receiving a gift or encountering a friend. External events affect the mood of an individual depending on how he or she perceives the action. Some evidence suggests that internal events, such as imagination and reasoning, are less likely than external events to be remembered after a mood shift. Eich and Metcalfe conducted several experiments on this subject. Each experiment was composed of an encoding session and a retrieval session. Subjects were asked to describe their current mood, and then listened to classical music chosen to instigate either happiness or sadness. As they listened to the music, subjects again expressed how they were feeling to keep their minds working.

The researchers came to several conclusions from this study. They found that events are generated through internal processes that are more connected to one's mood than to external processes. Although the source of an event seems to play a part in the occurrence of mood dependent memory, it is not the only relevant factor. In addition, memories vary in terms of the manner in which retention is measured. The strength and stability of moods that impair memory must meet two conditions: the mood shift must be substantial, and the mood at the start must be the same when it ends in encoding or retrieval. The relationship between mood and arousal is also important: if mood is dependent on arousal, then mood corresponds to a subjective state which describes mood dependent memory.

== Mood congruence versus mood dependence ==
There is a definitive difference in mood congruence and mood dependence. Lewis and Critchley discuss the difference in these memory effects. Mood congruence is when one can match an emotion to a specific memory. Mood dependence, on the other hand, is the sorting of memory when mood at retrieval is the same as encoding. After using others' research, Lewis and Critchley came to the conclusion that there is neural basis for the influence of mood at encoding and that this influence at the base relates to activity of emotion specific regions of the brain. One model they propose is the semantic network approach, which suggests that 'emotion-specific memory nodes connect many related aspects of an emotion, such as autonomic responses, expressive behaviours, and description of situations that might evoke the emotion'. Within this model, two assumptions may be made: remembering certain information while in a specific mood leads to responsiveness in the emotional system that corresponds to that particular mood and mood at retrieval influences ones' emotions. This relates to mood-dependent memory because it may suggest that ones' mood at encoding could become associated with neutral information. It may also imply the activity of emotions, triggered by mood at retrieval, could propagate to the nodes with the same mood at encoding.

Lewis and Critchley, however, state that the semantic-network approach is weak for three reasons. First, though emotions retrieve past information, one cannot decipher between positive and negative moods in this particular approach. Second, it is unclear as to whether positive and negative moods at recall lead to activity in a positive or negative way in the emotions. Lastly, researchers cannot prove that emotional activity due to mood could interact with emotional activity associated with remembrance. For these reasons, the semantic-network approach is not as reliable as researchers would have hoped.

== Music-dependent memory ==
Music-dependent memory is an effect of mood-dependent memory. There have been many studies conducted that have suggested that the music one listens to may affect their mood. In Balch and Lewis’ article, they studied how the participants’ moods were affected by the change in tempo of a musical piece. The participants were each given a list of words to read while music played in the background, with varying tempos distributed randomly. The participants were then asked to recall all the words they had read previously. Balch and Lewis found that the participants were able to remember more words when the tempo did not change. This same experiment was composed in different ways: with a change in timbre, a different song playing, or silence with no music at all. However, none of these experiments returned results suggesting that changing the different aspects of music affected the memory of participants, indicating that change in tempo seemed to be the only thing that influenced the participants’ memories. There is still much research being done concerning music-dependent memory.

== See also ==
- Context-dependent memory
- Emotion and memory
- Sensory memory
