= Affective memory =

Acting technique

Affective memory was an early element of Stanislavski's 'system'. It was adopted by Lee Strasberg and made a central part of his own acting technique 'The Method' more broadly referred to as method acting. Affective memory requires actors to call on the memory of details from a similar situation (or more recently a situation with similar emotions) and substitute those feelings for those of their characters. Stanislavski believed actors needed to take emotion and personality to the stage and call upon it when playing their character. He also explored the use of objectives, actioning, and empathizing with the character.

"Emotional recall" is the basis for method acting. "Sense memory" is used to refer to the recall of physical sensations surrounding emotional events (instead of the emotions themselves) through a structured process based on a series of exercises. The use of affective memory remains a controversial topic in acting theory. Otherwise known as emotional memory, it is often used by making the actors completely relax so that they recall the memory better.

== See also ==
- Emotion and memory
- Presentational acting and representational acting
