= R v Daviault =

- Supreme Court of Canada

Hearing: February 4, 1994 Judgment: September 30, 1994
- Full case name: Henri Daviault v. Her Majesty The Queen
- Citations: [1994] 3 S.C.R. 63
- Docket No.: 23435
- Ruling: Appeal allowed, new trial ordered.

Court membership
- Chief Justice: Antonio Lamer; Puisne Justices: Gérard La Forest, Claire L'Heureux-Dubé, John Sopinka, Charles Gonthier, Peter Cory, Beverley McLachlin, Frank Iacobucci, John C. Major

Reasons given
- Majority: Cory J., joined by L'Heureux-Dubé, McLachlin and Iacobucci JJ.
- Concurrence: Lamer C.J.
- Concurrence: La Forest J.
- Dissent: Sopinka J., joined by Gonthier and Major JJ.

R v Daviault [1994] 3 S.C.R. 63, is a Supreme Court of Canada decision on the availability of the defence of intoxication for "general intent" criminal offences. The Leary rule which eliminated the defence was found unconstitutional in violation of both section 7 and 11(d) of the Canadian Charter of Rights and Freedoms. Instead, intoxication can only be used as a defence where it is so extreme that it is akin to automatism or insanity.

== Background ==
On May 30, 1989, Henri Daviault, a 73-year-old chronic alcoholic, was asked to get some alcohol for a friend of his wife. The woman was a semi-paralyzed 65-year-old and required a wheelchair. Daviault brought a 40oz of brandy to the woman's house around 6pm. She drank half a glass and then passed out. Daviault drank the rest of the bottle while she slept. Some time in the evening she went to the washroom and was accosted by Daviault who took her into the bedroom and sexually assaulted her. Daviault was arrested and charged for sexual assault.

Daviault testified that prior to the event he had drunk over seven beers at a bar, and after drinking some brandy at the woman's house he has no recollection of what had happened until he woke up naked in the woman's bed.

At trial, he argued that during his blackout he was in automatism-like state brought about by intoxication. An expert witness in pharmacology testified to the likelihood of the defence, and that having drunk as much as he did there was little chance he could have functioned normally or been aware of his actions.

Based on the testimony of the pharmacologist, the trial judge found that Daviault was unable to form a general intent to commit the crime and therefore could be acquitted.

The Quebec Court of Appeal overturned the acquittal ruling that intoxication to the point of automatism cannot negate the mens rea requirement for a general intent offence (i.e. offences where mens rea can be implied from the commission of the act).

The issue before the Supreme Court was whether "a state of drunkenness which is so extreme that an accused is in a condition that closely resembles automatism or a disease of the mind as defined in s. 16 of the Criminal Code constitute a basis for defending a crime which requires not a specific but only a general intent?"

The Court held, 6 to 3, that the absence of a defence for a general intent offence on the basis of intoxication akin to insanity or automatism violated section 7 and 11(d) of the Charter, and could not be saved under section 1. They overturned the verdict and ordered a new trial.

== Reasons of the court ==
The majority was written by Cory J., with L'Heureux-Dubé, McLachlin, and Iacobucci JJ. concurring. Lamer and La Forest JJ. each concurred separately with Cory's results.

Cory considered the basis of the Court of Appeal's ruling. The lower court had applied the "Leary rule" from Leary v. The Queen [1978] which held that intoxication akin to insanity could not negate mens rea for "general intent" crimes such as sexual assault. The rationale was based on the legal presumption that "a person intends the natural consequences of his or her act." For fear of having intoxication become an escape route for any general intent crime, the Leary rule addressed this by requiring the Crown to only prove that the accused intended to become intoxicated in substitute for establishing mens rea.

=== Section 7 and 11(d) ===
The Leary rule predated the Charter and so had not been considered in light of section 7. It is well established that a principle of fundamental justice was that the Crown must establish mens rea for all offences. However, Cory noted, the Leary rule made the act of drinking a potentially criminal act, removing any direct link to the actual prohibited conduct.

Section 11(d) provides the right to be presumed innocent which requires the Crown to prove all elements of an offence. All mental elements must be "absolutely linked" to the offence in question, however, Cory found that the Leary rule failed to meet this requirement, as he was unable to equate the intent to become intoxicated with the involuntariness of committing an offence.

Basically, the issue was that such offenders may not actually have the blameworthy intent for a legal finding of guilt and may, therefore, be punished based on intoxication, rather than for commission of a crime.

=== Section 1 ===
The violation of section 7 and 11(d), Cory held, could not be saved under section 1. The objective of the rule was not sufficient to pass the first step of the Oakes test, as in fact, many jurisdictions had already abandoned the rule.

The rule also failed every step of the proportionality test. The relationship between alcohol and crime was not substantial enough to rationally link the two. As well, the rule was less than minimally impairing as it provided exemption for all general intent crimes.

=== Remedy ===
Rather than just strike out the rule altogether Cory opted for a more flexible solution. He proposed that normal levels of intoxication should not be treated any different from sober individuals; however, those who were so intoxicated that it would be akin to automatism or insanity could rely on a defence of intoxication on the balance of probabilities. Cory speculated that this burden would likely violate section 11(d) however it would also likely be saved under section 1.

For Daviault, Cory allowed the appeal and ordered a new trial.

== Dissent ==
A dissent was given by Sopinka J. with Gonthier and Major JJ. concurring.

== Aftermath ==
Parliament under the first Chretien government reacted swiftly in response to the ruling, and within months passed Bill C-72 to amend the Criminal Code (1995, c. 32) in section 33.1 under the heading of Self-induced Intoxication. The preamble forms a severe denunciation of the impugned practice and an endorsement of the most vulnerable members of society.

33.1 (1) It is not a defence to an offence referred to in subsection (3) that the accused, by reason of self-induced intoxication, lacked the general intent or the voluntariness required to commit the offence, where the accused departed markedly from the standard of care as described in subsection (2).

(2) For the purposes of this section, a person departs markedly from the standard of reasonable care generally recognized in Canadian society and is thereby criminally at fault where the person, while in a state of self-induced intoxication that renders the person unaware of, or incapable of consciously controlling, their behaviour, voluntarily or involuntarily interferes or threatens to interfere with the bodily integrity of another person.

(3) This section applies in respect of an offence under this Act or any other Act of Parliament that includes as an element an assault or any other interference or threat of interference by a person with the bodily integrity of another person

The Supreme Court would strike down section 33.1 in R v Brown.
