= Night Things (band) =

American musical group

Night Things (formerly known as Badlands) is a Los Angeles–based new wave band comprising Zach Shields and Maize LaRue.

== History ==
Main singers/songwriters Zach Shields and Maize LaRue met in 2008 when Shields’ prior band, Dead Man's Bones, was recording and performing with The Silverlake Conservatory Children’s Choir, which LaRue belonged to. Soon the two began singing together, covering everything from Echo and the Bunnymen to The Everly Brothers, often performing at LaRue’s grandmother’s retirement home. Not long after this, Shields and LaRue began to experience recurring dreams about one another. In these dreams, Shields would often have to come to LaRue’s rescue, struggling in vain to save her from a horde of faceless tormentors.

Inspired by this narrative, the duo began writing original music, culminating with the 2013 release of their first song and video, “Sleeping Beauty” under their former band name Badlands. Pitchfork described the track as "an impeccable mix of whispery vocals, layered guitar and piano work, and steady bass drum that invokes Phil Spector". Since then, Night Things has used dreams as the creative engine behind their content, both musical and visual, including in their 2017 LP, Cost Of The Summer.

In April 2017 the band released track "Cost Of The Summer" accompanied by a Ryan Heffington–directed video via NPR Music. It was followed by another track, "Reasons", which was praised by Stereogum "breathy and dynamic ’80s pop throwback with a thoughtful arrangement and tremendous emotional power".
