= Sexual abuse scandal in the Roman Catholic Archdiocese of St. John's, Newfoundland =

Catholic church sexual abuse case in Canada

Several cases of sexual abuse in St. John's archdiocese have been reported, starting in 1988. It is an important chapter in the series of clerical abuse affairs that occurred in the dioceses of Canada.

== James Hickey affair ==
In September 1988, Fr. James Hickey pleaded guilty to 20 charges of sexual assault, gross indecency and indecent assault involving teenage boys while he was a parish priest on the Burin Peninsula and in the St. John's area. He spent five years in prison, serving his sentence at Her Majesty's Penitentiary, St. John's, and Dorchester Penitentiary, NB. Despite Hickey's criminal conviction, archdiocese leaders fought against the victims' lawsuits demanding damages for over 20 years. Hickey died in 1992.

In February 2009, the Supreme Court of Newfoundland and Labrador ruled that the Archdiocese of St. John's was "vicariously liable" for the sexual abuse of eight former altar boys by Hickey.

== Mount Cashel orphanage scandal ==
In 1988, a scandal erupted over allegations of widespread abuse of children at Mount Cashel Orphanage in Newfoundland. From 1989 to 1993, nine Christian Brothers were charged and prosecuted for various criminal offences including sex offences against the boys of Mount Cashel orphanage. The religious order that ran the orphanage filed for bankruptcy in the face of numerous lawsuits. Since the Mount Cashel scandal erupted, a number of priests across the country have been accused of sexual abuse.

In July 2020, the Court of Appeal for Newfoundland and Labrador unanimously reversed a 2018 Canadian Supreme ruling and ruled that the Archdiocese of St. John's was liable for the sexual abuse committed at the Mount Cashel Orphanage in the 1950s and 1960s.

In July 2021, the Archdiocese of St. John's announced plans to sell off assets in order to compensate victims of the Mount Cashel sex abuse scandal.

=== Hughes Inquiry ===
The Hughes Inquiry was a Canadian royal commission which concluded that officials had transferred offenders and covered up the sexual abuse at Mount Cashel. It recommended that victims be compensated. The commission began inquiry investigations on 1 June 1989 and published its report in April 1992.

=== Resignation of bishop Penney ===
The Winter Commission was appointed in 1989 by Archbishop Alphonsus Penney and released its report during the following year. Its final report, submitted in 1990, was entitled The report of the Archdiocesan Commission of Enquiry into the Sexual Abuse of Children by Members of the Clergy.

Archbishop Penney resigned on February 2, 1991, following the release of the commission's report, which placed some of the blame for cover-ups of the abuse on him.

== Allegations against bishop Lahey ==
In 1989, Fr. Kevin Molloy went to former St. John's archbishop Alphonsus Liguori Penney to report that a child had seen pornography at the home of a priest Raymond Lahey. These allegations were recounted in 2009 when Bishop Lahey was subsequently arrested for separate allegations involving illicit pornography (see: sexual abuse scandal in Antigonish diocese).

== 1992 guidelines from the CCCB ==
In 1992, the Canadian Catholic bishops responded by unveiling guidelines, calling for fairness and openness to all allegations, stressing the need to "respect" the jurisdiction of outside authorities, and recommending counselling and compassion for the victims. However, some assert that, the bishops' guidelines notwithstanding, the sexual abuse problems have not been adequately addressed.

== 2004 Supreme Court decision ==
In 2004, the Supreme Court of Canada in Doe v Bennett, upheld the lower court's decision that the ecclesiastical corporation, Roman Catholic Episcopal Corporation of St. George's in Western Newfoundland, was vicariously liable (as well as directly liable) for sexual abuse by Father Kevin Bennett.

== Rev. Peter Power controversy ==
In July 2020, Rev. Peter Power, who was originally from the Archdiocese of Toronto, was charged with charges of sexual touching, sexual assault and committing an indecent act involving two teenaged boys, aged 18 and 16 years old at a residence in a small Newfoundland community earlier in the year. Though officially retired, Power was still occasionally active in Catholic ministry when he relocated to Newfoundland.

== British Columbia Link to the St. John's archdiocese ==
In February 2021, a British Columbia man alleged that he was sexually abused by one of the Christian Brother's, who confessed to the Royal Newfoundland Constabulary of molesting children at the Mount Cashel Orphanage in 1975.

In August 2022, a British Columbia man, known only as 'John B. Doe,' filed a class action lawsuit in British Columbia, alleging that he was physically and sexually abused while attending Vancouver College, a preparatory Catholic School for boys located in the Shaughnessy neighbourhood of Vancouver, British Columbia. The lawsuit alleges that six Christian Brothers working as teachers at the school, were known to have committed crimes, (in some cases admitted to crimes) against children in NL, before being transferred to Vancouver to teach at Vancouver College.

In September 2022, police in Burnaby, BC, acknowledged that they had an active investigation in relation to a complaint against a former NL Christian Brother, who was transferred from the Mount Cashel Orphanage subsequent to allegations of child molestation, to St. Thomas More Collegiate, a private school ran by the congregation of Christian Brothers. The complainant, John A. Doe, is accusing former Christian Brother Edward English of abuse allegations during his time at the private college. John A. Doe, questions how Brother English was allowed to quietly be transferred from NL to BC, without charges, after admitting to molesting children to the Royal Newfoundland Constabulary, in 1975.

In March 2023, a class action lawsuit was approved to move forward by a British Columbia court. Darren Libtrot, the lead plaintiff in the suit, claims he was physically and sexually abused by then Christian Brother Edward English, who admitted to sexual abuse against children to Newfoundland police in the 1970s. However, English along with several other Christian Brothers were moved out of the province of Newfoundland and Labrador in an elaborate cover up by the Royal Newfoundland Constabulary, and the NL Justice Department. Libtrot has since been joined by dozens of men claiming they suffered physical and sexual abuse while students at St. Thomas More Collegiate and Vancouver College.

In November 2023, Edward English was arrested by Vancouver police at his home in New Brunswick, over allegations of sex abuse stemming from his time working at Vancouver College, a private Catholic boys' school.

== See also ==
- Catholic Church sexual abuse cases in Canada
- Child sexual abuse
- Religious abuse
- Roman Catholic Archdiocese of St. John's, Newfoundland
- Sexual abuse cases in the Congregation of Christian Brothers
