= Winter Commission =

Catholic commission investigating sexual abuse in Newfoundland, Canada

The Winter Commission was a diocesan commission appointed in May 1989 by Alphonsus Liguori Penney, the Roman Catholic Archbishop of St. Johns, to conduct hearings surrounding the Mount Cashel abuse affairs.

The commission headed by former Lieutenant Governor of Newfoundland and Labrador Gordon Arnaud Winter, a member of the Anglican Church of Canada. It conducted hearings in churches across the province, commencing on June 11, 1989. Its final report, submitted in 1990, was entitled The report of the Archdiocesan Commission of Enquiry into the Sexual Abuse of Children by Members of the Clergy.

Archbishop Penney resigned following the release of the commission's report, which placed some of the blame for cover-ups of the abuse on him.

== See also ==
- Catholic Church sexual abuse cases in Canada
- Religious abuse
- Roman Catholic Archdiocese of St. John's, Newfoundland
- Sexual abuse cases in the Congregation of Christian Brothers
- Sexual abuse in St. John's archdiocese
