= Gordon Arnaud Winter =

Lieutenant Governor of Newfoundland and Labrador

The Honourable Gordon Arnaud Winter OC

6th Lieutenant Governor of Newfoundland
- In office July 2, 1974 – July 10, 1981
- Monarch: Elizabeth II
- Governors General: Jules Léger; Edward Schreyer
- Premier: Frank Moores; Brian Peckford
- Preceded by: Ewart Harnum
- Succeeded by: Tony Paddon

Personal details
- Born: October 6, 1912 St. John's, Dominion of Newfoundland
- Died: August 1, 2003 (aged 90) St. John's, Newfoundland and Labrador

Gordon Arnaud Winter, OC (October 6, 1912 – August 1, 2003) was the sixth lieutenant governor of Newfoundland from 1974 to 1981.

In 1974, he was made an Officer of the Order of Canada.

In 1989, he headed the Winter Commission, the diocesan commission appointed by bishop Alphonsus Liguori Penney to undertake an inquiry about the clerical child sexual abuse scandal at Mount Cashel orphanage.
