= Michael Harris (journalist) =

Canadian writer and radio personality

Michael Harris CM
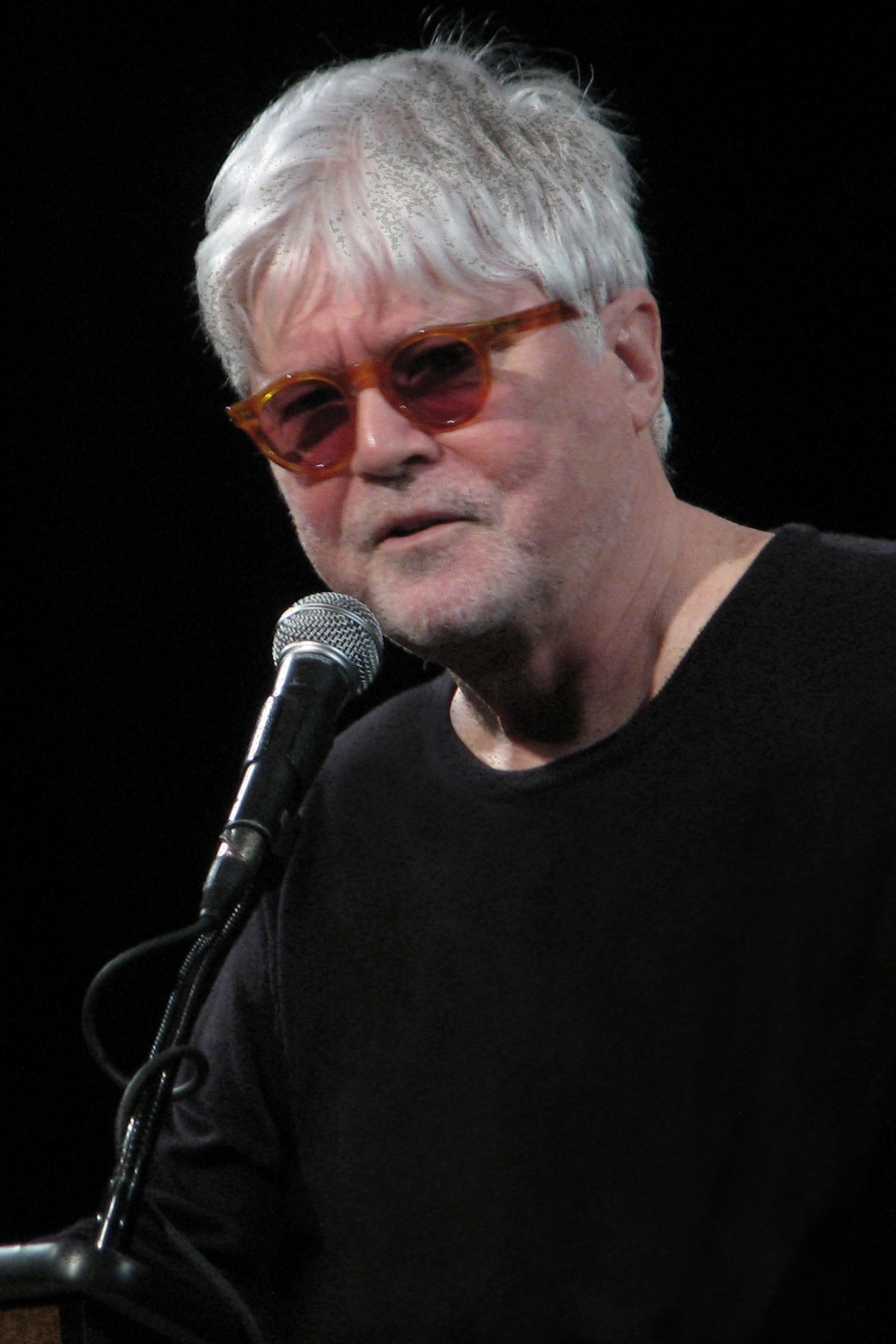
- Michael Harris at the Registry Theatre, April 2015
- Born: Michael Terry Harris; Toronto, Ontario, Canada
- Citizenship: Canada
- Education: York University
- Occupations: Writer, journalist, author, filmmaker
- Writing career
- Language: English
- Subjects: Canadian Politics, abuse of power, government malfeasance, democracy
- Website: www.michaeltharris.org

Michael Terry Harris CM (born 1948) is a Canadian investigative journalist, radio personality, documentary filmmaker, novelist, iPolitics columnist and the author of nine books.

Born in Toronto, Ontario, to Audrey McDonald (née Tilley) and James McDonald, Harris is a graduate of York University in Toronto, and was a Woodrow Wilson Scholar (University College in Dublin, Ireland). His work has sparked four Royal Commissions of Inquiry.

Harris went to Newfoundland in 1977, as a story editor for CBC Television owned-and-operated station CBNT's newscast Here and Now, before becoming in 1986 the founding publisher and editor-in-chief of The Sunday Express weekly in St. John's, nationally recognized as "the best little newspaper in Canada." There he broke the Mount Cashel orphanage abuse story and the Sprung Greenhouse boondoggle. Later he went on to become the Executive Director of News and Current Affairs for the Newfoundland Broadcasting Company, then owner of the local CTV Television Network affiliate CJON (NTV).

Harris was at one time a Queen's Park correspondent for the National Post, The Globe and Mail as Atlantic Bureau Chief and later a senior parliamentary correspondent in Ottawa.

In Ottawa Harris hosted an afternoon radio talk show, Michael Harris Live, on Ottawa-based CFRA, and was a columnist for The Ottawa Sun newspaper until March 2011. Michael Harris Live on CFRA Ottawa was cancelled February 9, 2012. He is now a columnist for the website iPolitics.

His 1986 book Justice Denied: The Law Versus Donald Marshall detailed the story of Donald Marshall, Jr.’s wrongful conviction in 1972. His investigative journalism culminating in the book Unholy Orders: Tragedy at Mount Cashel, triggered the Hughes Inquiry into the allegations of abuse at the Mount Cashel Orphanage. Harris also authored Rare Ambition: The Crosbies of Newfoundland, Con Game: The Truth About Canada’s Prisons and Lament for an Ocean: The Collapse of the Atlantic Cod Fishery. Elizabeth May, the executive director of the Sierra Club of Canada called it "The definitive book on the cod catastrophe ... After reading this book, you wouldn't trust Fisheries and Oceans Canada with your aquarium". His 1976 novel Outrider on Yonge Street was never published.

Harris is married and has two daughters. As of 2011 he hosted Ottawa's annual "Alzheimers Flame of Hope Golf Tournament" (his mother, who died in 2009, suffered from the disease), and divided his time between his homes in Ottawa, Ontario and Lunenburg, Nova Scotia. He was the visiting Irving Chair in Journalism at St. Thomas University in New Brunswick.

== Works ==
=== Non-fiction ===
- Justice denied: The law versus Donald Marshall (1986), Macmillan of Canada, ISBN 0771596901
- Unholy Orders: Tragedy at Mount Cashel (1990), Viking Adult, ISBN 0670834815
- Rare Ambition : The Crosbies of Newfoundland (1993), Penguin, ISBN 0140232206
- The Prodigal Husband: the Tragedy of Helmuth and Hanna Buxbaum (1994), McClelland & Stewart, ISBN 0771039565
- The Judas Kiss: The Undercover Life of Patrick Kelly (1996), McClelland & Stewart, ISBN 077103959X
- Harris, Michael (1998). Lament for an Ocean: The Collapse of the Atlantic Cod Fishery, a True Crime Story. McClelland & Stewart. ISBN 978-0-7710-3958-4.
- Con Game: The Truth About Canada's Prisons (2002), McClelland & Stewart, ISBN 0771039611
- Party of One: Stephen Harper And Canada's Radical Makeover (2014), Viking, ISBN 0670067016

=== Movies ===
- Unholy Orders (based on the book)
- Vanishing Point (based on Lament for an Ocean: The Collapse of the Atlantic Cod Fishery)
- Murder, Most Likely (based on The Judas Kiss: The Undercover Life of Patrick Kelly (1999)

== Awards and honours ==
=== Awards ===
- Unholy Orders: the Tragedy at Mount Cashel received the Foundation for the Advancement of Canadian Letters' Book of the Year award.
- "Unheard Cries: The Burial of Sexual Abuse at Mt. Cashel Orphanage" in The Sunday Express won a 1990 Centre for Investigative Journalism Award.
- Rare Ambition: the Crosbies of Newfoundland was the 1994 winner of the TORGI Talking Book of the Year, the Foundation for The Advancement of Canadian Letters Book of the Year Award
- The Prodigal Husband: the Tragedy of Helmuth and Hanna Buxbaum won the 1995 Arthur Ellis Awards / Prix Arthur Ellis prize for the best true crime book in Canada
- Lament for an Ocean: The Collapse of the Atlantic Cod Fishery was short listed for the Donner Prize in 1998
- Forest For Christmas won the 2014 Amazon.ca First Novel Award

=== Honours ===
Michael Harris was awarded a Doctor of Laws by the Memorial University of Newfoundland for his "unceasing pursuit of justice for the less fortunate among us."

He was the visiting Irving Chair in Journalism at St. Thomas University in New Brunswick.
