= Catholic Church sexual abuse cases in Canada =

Catholic Church sexual abuse cases in Canada are well documented dating back to the 1960s. The preponderance of criminal cases with Canadian Catholic dioceses named as defendants that have surfaced since the 1980s strongly indicate that these cases were far more widespread than previously believed. While recent media reports have centred on Newfoundland dioceses, there have been reported cases—tested in court with criminal convictions—in almost all Canadian provinces. Sexual assault is the act of an individual touching another individual sexually and/or committing sexual activities forcefully and/or without the other person's consent. The phrase Catholic sexual abuse cases refers to acts of sexual abuse, typically child sexual abuse, by members of authority in the Catholic church, such as priests. Such cases have been occurring sporadically since the 11th century in Catholic churches around the world. This article summarizes some of the most notable Catholic sexual abuse cases in Canadian provinces.

== History ==
Archival documents demonstrate that the Roman Catholic Church was aware of the prevalence of child sexual abuse by their priests as early as 1917. Advocates, media, and civil society often point out that the Roman Catholic Church prioritizes avoiding scandals over finding justice for survivors of clergy abuse.

=== 1917 Code of Canon Law ===
The 1917 Code of Canon Law was introduced and was in use until January 25, 1983. It contained the following penal provision specifically addressing child sexual abuse:

2359 § 2 If they engage in a delict against the sixth precept of the Decalogue with a minor below the age of sixteen, or engage in adultery, debauchery, bestiality, sodomy, pandering, incest with blood-relatives or affines in the first degree, they are suspended, declared infamous, and are deprived of any office, benefice, dignity, responsibility, if they have such, whatsoever, and in more serious cases, they are to be deposed.

=== 1922 Instructio De Modo Procedendi in Causis Sollicitationis ===
In 1922, the Vatican Press issued Instructio De Modo Procedendi in Causis Sollicitationis (Instruction on procedure in solicitation cases) outlining secret procedures to deal with sexual crimes by priests, including "The Worst Crime", being sexual relations with a minor. The document itself, the procedure and all participants, including the victims, were to be sworn to the highest level of Holy secrecy.

=== 1962 Updated Instructio De Modo Procedendi in Causis Sollicitationis ===
In 1962, the Vatican Press issued an updated version of Instructio De Modo Procedendi in Causis Sollicitationis. This version included precedents, one of which was for the oath of secrecy to be taken by all exposed to the allegation and investigation. A New York Times article published on July 1, 2010, said that the 1962 instruction was a restatement of that of 1922, giving the Sacred Congregation of the Holy Office authority to prosecute clergy accused of sexual abuse.

=== 1983 Code of Canon Law ===
The 1983 Code of Canon Law was promulgated on January 25, 1983, and continued to include a specific penal provision against priests having sex with minors. The new provision reads:

1395 § 2 - A cleric who has offended in other ways against the sixth commandment of the Decalogue, if the crime was committed by force, or by threats, or in public, or with a minor under the age of sixteen years, is to be punished with just penalties, not excluding dismissal from the clerical state if the case so warrants.

=== 1992 Report of Canadian Conference of Catholic Bishops ===
Following the scandal over allegations of widespread abuse of children at Mount Cashel Orphanage in Newfoundland, the Roman Catholic Church began to slowly address the issue of rampant sexual abuse within its dioceses. In 1992, the Ad Hoc Committee on Child Sexual Abuse of the Canadian Conference of Catholic Bishops published a report entitled From Pain to Hope on abuse in Canada, with recommendations that the Church must emphasize victims rather than the institution. However, the recommendations did not appear to have the desired effect. For example, a letter made available to the public in 2010 revealed that a Canadian Catholic bishop wrote to Rome in 1993, just one year after the recommendations, to discuss ways to keep Bernard Prince, a priest convicted of sexual abuse, hidden in the Vatican instead of facing justice in Canada.

=== Criminalization of Abuse of Adults by Priests ===
In 2021, Pope Francis changed the Vatican's Code of Canon Law to explicitly criminalize sexual abuse of adults by priests. Prior to this change, the church did not recognize that adults could be victims of priests who abuse their positions of trust and authority. The changes to articles 1395 and 1398 of Canon Law also provided, for the first time in history, for laypeople who work for the church to be punished for abusing minors and adults.

=== Controversy over the Catholic Church's net worth and compensation for victims of clergy abuse ===
Following a Globe and Mail investigation in the summer of 2021, the extent of Canadian wealth held by the Catholic Church was revealed publicly. In total, the combined assets of Catholic organizations within Canada totaled at least $4.1 billion Canadian dollars as of 2019. As of 2021, there are 3,466 registered Catholic Church charities within Canada. Combined, they received $886 million Canadian dollars in 2019, which makes the Canadian Catholic Church the largest charitable organization in Canada.

Critics of the church, advocacy groups, and victims of clergy abuse have claimed that the Catholic Church, its dioceses, and representatives have been disingenuous when they claim that they are unable to compensate survivors of clergy abuse due to a lack of funds. In 2021, discussions about abuse within Canadian residential schools reignited this criticism.

=== Jesuits of Canada publish list of those in its ranks credibly accused of sexual abuse of minors ===
In December 2019, the Jesuits of Canada announced a comprehensive audit of credible accusations of sexual abuse of minors by its members.

In 2023, they published a list of 27 individuals within their ranks of having been credibly accused of sexual abuse of a minor.

== Sexual Abuse Cases in Alberta ==
=== Fr. Robert Joseph Whyte ===
Between 1962 and 1982, Fr. Robert Joseph Whyte abused 18 boys and girls during his time as a parish priest of St. Pius Catholic Church and a Catholic high school teacher. He abused children at a youth camp near Radium, British Columbia. In 1989, Whyte was charged 18 count of sexual abuse and pleaded guilty to each charge in January 1990. Whyte, who received a four-year prison sentence, is among at least four Basilian Order priests in Canada accused of sex abuse.

In 2016, a 52-year-old man who claimed that Whyte molested him when he was between the ages of eight and fifteen filed a lawsuit at the Calgary Courts Centre. The estate of Whyte, who died in 2014, and the Catholic Church in Alberta were each named as defendants in the lawsuit. The plaintiff, who was also serving as an altar boy at the time of the alleged abuse, filed a $4 million lawsuit for damages.

=== Rev Patrick O'Neill ===
In 1997, Archdiocese of Edmonton priest Rev. Patrick O'Neill was convicted of sexually abusing three Alberta boys between 1971 and 1984. In November 1998, was sentenced to two years less a day in prison. In 1999, O'Neill received a conditional sentence after pleading guilty to sexually abusing two Irish boys he brought to Edmonton for holiday in the mid-1990s.

In January 2012, a 51-year-old former altar boy who claimed he was sexually abused by O'Neill in the early and mid-1970s filed two $3.4 million lawsuits against the Archdiocese of Edmonton.

=== Fr. Frederick (Fred) Cahill ===
In 2019, two former students of Bishop Grandin High School settled lawsuits for the sexual abuse they experienced at the hands of Father Frederick Cahill. Cahill was a Basilian priest and a teacher at Bishop Grandin High School. Father Cahill died in 1983.

== Sexual Abuse Cases in Manitoba ==
In April 2021, Fr. Fred Olds, formerly pastor of the parishes of St. Bernadette and St. Timothy in the Archdiocese of Saint Boniface in Winnipeg, Manitoba, was dismissed from the clerical state following a canonical trial which determined that "he [Olds] engaged in grooming of young men, who were struggling with, or recovering from, drug or alcohol addiction by attempting to become a father-figure to them... becoming increasingly overly tactile in counselling situations... There is established a clear pattern of grooming young men, struggling with addictions, to eventually engage in sexual behaviour." Olds was removed from the Diocesan Advisory Committee for the Protection of Minors and Vulnerable Adults and placed on administrative leave from his office as Pastor of St. Timothy in late 2016 after these allegation were brought to the attention of the Archdiocese of St. Boniface. Statements about Olds' alleged conduct were also made during the arrest and sentencing of Leo McCaughan, former business manager of St. Bernadette Parish, who pleaded guilty to embezzling over $400,000 in church funds in 2016.

== Sexual Abuse Cases in New Brunswick ==
As of 2017, court records indicate at least 56 cases of child sexual abuse involving the New Brunswick dioceses are currently before the courts. According to one CBC report: "Almost every month for a year, lawsuits have been filed against the Catholic Church in New Brunswick by alleged victims seeking compensation for sexual abuse by priests."

== Sexual Abuse Cases in British Columbia ==
=== Archdiocese of Vancouver ===
In 2019, the Archdiocese of Vancouver publicly named nine clergymen who were criminally convicted of sexual abuse or who had civil lawsuits related to abuse settled against them. It was also acknowledged that the archdiocese was aware of 36 sex abuse cases since the 1950s, which involved 26 children. The Archdiocese of Vancouver was the first among Canada's 60 Catholic dioceses to make this information public.

In August 2020, a new sex abuse lawsuit was filed against the Archdiocese of Vancouver. The lead plaintiff, identified only by the initials K.S. in the court documents, said the priest in charge of St. Francis of Assisi School, Father Michael Conaghan, sexually assaulted her while she was a student at the school in the 1980s. She was around 11 years old at the time of the alleged abuse.

Conaghan, who died four days after the lawsuit was filed, was not among the nine clergy listed by the archdiocese in 2019. The lawsuit also alleged the Archdiocese of Vancouver followed marching orders from the Vatican for years on how to bury allegations of abuse within its parishes.

=== Hubert Patrick O'Connor ===
Hubert Patrick O'Connor was a Canadian Roman Catholic bishop of Prince George in British Columbia who was forced to resign following sex abuse charges filed against him.

=== Fr. Damian Lawrence Cooper ===
Fr. Damian Lawrence Cooper is a Vancouver priest who was first accused of sexual abuse in 1994. He was sued in the B.C. Supreme Court along with the Archdiocese of Vancouver on September 29, 2014. The plaintiff visited the priest for counseling prior to the abuse, and was sixteen years old when the sexual abuse began. Media coverage of the lawsuit unearthed the fact that, despite initial claims of having removed Cooper permanently from the priestly ministry when the abuse was first admitted in 1994, the Archdiocese of Vancouver instead sent him to work in an archdiocese on Long Island, New York. In Long Island, he then committed "problems of a similar nature". The archdiocese's official comments to the media referred to the abuse as "an affair" which raised public expressions of concern, including questions about whether the archdiocese was being legally aggressive or simply remained ignorant of the nature of pastoral sexual exploitation when it equated sexual exploitation of a minor and a congregant with "an affair". Cooper was still a priest of the Archdiocese of Vancouver at this time, technically on leave, but had not been laicized (permanently removed from active ministry as a priest). He lives in Vancouver, Washington.

=== Fr. Erlindo Molon ===
On August 25, 2020, British Columbia justice David Crossin ordered the office of the Bishop of Kamloops and retired priest Fr. Erlindo Molon, who was by then 88 years old, to pay $844,140 in damages to Rosemary Anderson, who claimed Molon raped her 70 to 100 times in 1976 and 1977, beginning when she was 26 years old. Anderson claimed Molon offered her counselling when she was grieving her father's death. During the lawsuit, former Kamloops Bishop, and future Vancouver Archbishop, Adam Exner, who was previously Molon's superior, conceded during witness testimony that he knew Molon "was molesting people," including Anderson. Exner also stated that Molon was not stripped of his priesthood status until after Anderson told him that Molon raped her and suggested that she marry him.

== Sexual Abuse Cases in Newfoundland ==
For decades, the Archdiocese of St. John's has been tied to sex abuse scandals.

=== James Hickey affair ===
In September 1988, Fr. James Hickey pleaded guilty to 20 charges of sexual assault, gross indecency and indecent assault involving teenage boys while he was a parish priest on the Burin Peninsula and in the St. John's area. He spent five years in prison, serving his sentence at Her Majesty's Penitentiary, St. John's, and Dorchester Penitentiary in New Brunswick. Despite Hickey's criminal conviction the Archdiocese fought against the victims' lawsuits demanding damages for over 20 years.

Hickey was the first priest convicted in a sexual-abuse scandal. Hickey died in 1992.

In February 2009, the Supreme Court of Newfoundland and Labrador ruled that the Archdiocese of St. John's was, "vicariously liable", for the sexual abuse of eight former altar boys by disgraced priest, Fr. James Hickey.

=== Mount Cashel orphanage scandal ===
In 1988, a scandal erupted over allegations of widespread abuse of children at Mount Cashel Orphanage in Newfoundland. Throughout 1989-1993, nine Christian Brothers were charged and prosecuted for various criminal offences including sex offences against the boys of Mount Cashel orphanage. The religious order that ran the orphanage filed for bankruptcy in the face of numerous lawsuits. Since the Mount Cashel scandal erupted, a number of priests across the country have been accused of sexual abuse.

In July 2020, the Court of Appeal for Newfoundland and Labrador unanimously reversed a 2018 Supreme Court ruling and ruled that the Archdiocese of St. John's was liable for the sexual abuse committed at the Mount Cashel Orphanage in the 1950s and 1960s.

In July 2021, the Archdiocese of St. John's announced plans to sell off assets in order to compensate victims of the Mount Cashel sex abuse scandal.

=== Other notable cases ===
In 1989, Fr. Kevin Molloy went to St. John's archbishop Alphonsus Liguori Penney to report that a child had seen pornography at the home of a priest Raymond Lahey. These allegations were recounted in 2009 when Bishop Lahey was subsequently arrested for separate allegations involving illicit pornography (see: sexual abuse scandal in Antigonish diocese).

In 2004, the Supreme Court of Canada in Doe v Bennett, upheld the lower court's decision that the ecclesiastical corporation, Roman Catholic Episcopal Corporation of St. George's in Western Newfoundland, was vicariously liable (as well as directly liable) for sexual abuse by Father Kevin Bennett.

In 2007, Reverend Wayne Dohey was charged with sexual assault and one charge of exploitation of a minor. The charges were dismissed due to insufficient evidence. The abuse allegedly occurred between 1996 and 2000 and started when the alleged victim was fourteen years old. Dohey was admitted to counseling in 2001. Controversy over the legality of the sexual relationship occurred because it was unclear whether Dohey was in a position of authority over the 14-year-old Anglican, who was placed at his church for mandatory community service.

In July 2020, Rev. Peter Power, who was originally from the Archdiocese of Toronto, was charged with charges of sexual touching, sexual assault and committing an indecent act involving two teenage boys, aged 18 and 16 years old at a residence in a small Newfoundland community earlier in the year. Though officially retired, Power was still occasionally active in Catholic ministry when he relocated to Newfoundland.

In August 2022, a British Columbia man, known only as 'John B. Doe,' filed a class action lawsuit in British Columbia, alleging that he was physically and sexually abused while attending Vancouver College, a preparatory Catholic School for boys located in the Shaughnessy neighbourhood of Vancouver, British Columbia. The lawsuit alleges that six Christian Brothers working as teachers at the school, were known to have committed crimes, (in some cases admitted to crimes) against children in NL, before being transferred to Vancouver to teach at Vancouver College.

In September 2022, police in Burnaby, BC, acknowledged that they had an active investigation in relation to a complaint against a former NL Christian Brother, who was transferred from the Mount Cashel Orphanage subsequent to allegations of child molestation, to St. Thomas More Collegiate, a private school ran by the congregation of Christian Brothers. The complainant, John A. Doe, is accusing former Christian Brother Edward English of abuse allegations during his time at the private college. John A. Doe, questions how Brother English was allowed to quietly be transferred from NL to BC, without charges, after admitting to molesting children to the Royal Newfoundland Constabulary, in 1975.

== Sexual Abuse Cases in Ontario ==
=== Bernard Ambrose Prince ===
In 2008, Msgr Bernard Ambrose Prince (born in Wilno, Ontario, ordained in 1964, incarnated in 1992 in Pembroke, Ontario) pleaded guilty to charges of sexual abuse of thirteen young boys from 1964 onward. He was sentenced to four years' incarceration in 2008. He was laicized by the Catholic Church in 2009, and paroled in 2010. His crimes were known in the Canadian Catholic Church and in the Vatican before he was appointed to Rome in 1991.

=== Archdiocese of Ottawa ===
In Ottawa, Ontario historical cases of child-sexual abuse by Catholic priests within the Ottawa archdiocese date back to the 1950s. Newspaper records of documented cases involved at least 11 abuser priests and 41 victims. Among these cases was those of convicted child sex offenders, Dale Crampton, Ken Keely, Jacques Faucher and Barry McGrory: all of whom served as priests in the Ottawa diocese in the 1970 and '80s under Archbishop Joseph-Aurèle Plourde--whose own role in these cases is well documented but was never held to account by the courts--and Bishop John Beahen, who was named posthumously in at least three separate lawsuits alleging sexual assault of children by him.

Investigative journalism by reporter Andrew Duffy revealed via court documents that as of 2016 there had been at least 41 acknowledged victims of clergy sexual abuse in the Ottawa diocese.

As of 2016, the Ottawa archdiocese had paid nearly $600,000 in settlements to abuse victims in seven lawsuits since 2011. Five more lawsuits at that time remained, with claimants seeking a total of $7.4 million.

In 2016, Ottawa archbishop Terrence Prendergast acknowledged "the enormity of the evil" in connection to these cases. As of 2026, the Ottawa Diocese has continued to resist both releasing a list of all credibly accused clergy in its ranks, and disclosing the full number of sexual assault cases it has faced in court in which it is named as defendant.

=== Dale Crampton ===
In 1986, Dale Crampton was arrested by Ottawa Police and convicted on seven counts of indecent assault involving minors. Those abuses occurred between January 1973 and December 1982, while Crampton was a priest at St. Maurice’s parish in the Catholic Archdiocese of Ottawa. The seven male victims were all between the ages of 10 and 13 when they were assaulted by Crampton.

Those assaults happened at Crampton’s West Carleton cottage and at St. Maurice’s parish in Ottawa, where he served for nine years. Other sexual assaults of children by Crampton were alleged to have occurred earlier at St. George’s parish in Ottawa, as well as St. Philip, St. Margaret Mary and St. Elizabeth parishes, elsewhere in Ontario.

Crampton was first given a suspended sentence in 1986 with no jail time, placed on probation, and ordered to undergo psychiatric counselling. That sentence was appealed by the Crown, and was successfully overturned in 1987. Crampton spent eight months in jail, after which he was assigned to work for the Toronto Regional Matrimonial Tribunal.

He retired from the priesthood in 1995 and died by suicide in 2010.

Despite his 1986 conviction and subsequent jail time, Crampton remained listed in the Canadian Catholic Church directory (the official annual registry of clergy in Canada) until 2010, shortly before his death.

Court documents in subsequent litigation against the Ottawa Catholic Diocese revealed that allegations of sexual abuse of children by Crampton dated back to the 1960s and implicated Bishop John Beahen and the Ottawa Diocese in—among other matters—the practice of “priest shuffling” of Crampton.

A 2023 CBC report citing multiple Ontario Court documents noted: “Beahen was allegedly told by two different young men that Crampton had sexually assaulted boys in Ottawa. One of the whistleblowers was Beahen's own nephew, who swore in a 2014 affidavit he told his uncle in 1966 that Crampton had sexually assaulted another member of Beahen's extended family. The other complainant was a friend of that nephew. He swore in a separate 2014 affidavit that Crampton fondled him at St. Margaret Mary parish in 1965, and that two weeks later he reported it to Beahen, who assured the young man he would handle it."

Crampton travelled with Beahen to New York City for the visit of Pope Paul VI in October 1965.

In October 1966, Crampton was transferred to Beahen's parish, St. Elizabeth's, where the two priests lived and worked together for a year and a half.

Both men were subsequently transferred to the Ottawa Diocese in the 1970s, where Beahen was ordained as Auxiliary Bishop in 1977: a position that held direct authority over Crampton and several other priests in the same diocese who would later on be convicted of sexual assaulting minors.

=== Bishop John Beahen ===
Once the second-highest-ranking member of the Ottawa Catholic Diocese, Beahen was named posthumously in three separate lawsuits involving the sexual abuse of children. All three cases were settled out of court by the Ottawa diocese.

In two of those cases, victims alleged to have been sexually assaulted by Beahen at Dale Crampton’s cottage between 1979 and 1981.

Court documents cited in a 2023 CBC story said that Beahen “was stripped of his faculties for five months after becoming a priest in 1946 due to his "run down condition," and in the fall of 1986 he was sent to Southdown, a facility that treats priests for alcoholism and sexual problems.”

In his role as Bishop (until suffering a fatal stroke in 1988),Beahen was responsible for managing complaints lodged against abusive priests. As one Ottawa newspaper observed in 2017: “The allegations(arising from civil lawsuits) also raise a potential motive for Beahen to dismiss (such) claims made against fellow clergy members in the 1970s and 80s.”

Similar questions were raised in an Ottawa Citizen editorial in June 1986 after Crampton's arrest: “One parent also complained about the priest (Crampton) to Bishop John Beahen, auxiliary bishop of the Ottawa Archdiocese. Church officials say Beahen didn’t pass on the information because he considered it confidential.”

=== William Barry McGrory ===
McGrory was the subject of several criminal proceedings.

In 1993, he was convicted of sexual assault of a 17-year old indigenous youth. He received a suspended sentence and three years of probation. In 2019, an Ontario court found McGrory guilty of two counts of indecent assault and two counts of gross indecency, stemming from the abuse of teenage boys in the late 1960s and early 1970s while he was a priest at Ottawa’s Immaculate Heart of Mary Church and St. Philips Church in nearby Richmond, Ontario.

In August 2020, Barry McGrory died at the age of 85 while in custody at the Ottawa-Carleton Detention Centre, following his December 2019 arrest in Toronto for failing to appear in court for sentencing in connection with the 2019 indecent assault and gross indecency convictions. Investigative journalism revealed that the Ottawa Diocese had quietly settled two claims against McGrory involving victims at Holy Cross Parish. A $300,000 settlement received by one of the victims was one of the largest in the diocese's history at that time. A third victim of McGrory’s sexual abuse commenced litigation, suing the diocese for $1.5 million. News reports indicate that the Ontario Court heard how McGrory abused his position of trust to groom and exploit vulnerable young victims. Evidence showed he used alcohol and medication to destabilize his victims before assaulting them.

As with the case of Dale Crampton, McGrory’s was another example of priest shuffling by the Ottawa Diocese during Joseph-Aurèle Plourde’s time as Archbishop and John Beahen’s as Auxilary Bishop. News reports indicate that when complaints were made in the 1980s, the Archdiocese removed McGrory from his parish but "quietly shipped" him to a Toronto-based organization rather than reporting him immediately to police.

This was corroborated by McGrory himself in a 2016 interview. “I’ll never understand Archbishop Plourde, why he sent me to Toronto. Maybe he just wanted to get rid of me,” said McGrory.

McGrory was laicized by the Diocese in 2018, but only in the wake of news reports in 2016, asking why that hadn’t happened earlier: particularly given his number of criminal convictions dating back to 1993. A full two years transpired between that first 1993 conviction and 1995, when the Archdiocese went on record saying McGrory’s rights to present himself as a Catholic priest and to perform its ministries had been removed. Those ministries include celebrating mass, hearing confessions and administering the sacraments.

McGrory is only one of two priests ever defrocked by the Ottawa Diocese. The first was Jean Gravel in 1970.

According to a 2016 Ottawa Sun story, McGrory had a lifelong association with Dale Crampton. The two were childhood friends and attended high school and the seminary together.

=== Kenneth Keeler ===
In the 1970s and 80s, Keeler was a pastor at Holy Rosary catholic church in lower town then at St. John the Apostle parish and founder of St. Brigid’s summer camp. In 1991, Keeler was charged with three counts of sexual assault involving minors, occurring at St. Brigid’s summer camp. In his 1993 trial, Keeler changed his plea to guilty.

In this case, a now-familiar pattern emerged in how the Ottawa Diocese handled disclosure of sexual abuse committed by members in their ranks. According to an Ottawa Sun story reporting on the 1993 trial, one victim testified he disclosed the abuse to then-Archbishop Marcel Gervais in January 1991. He further testified under oath that Gervais told him there was “no reason” to believe his story. The 1993 Sun story added a rebuttal from Gervais that was not issued under oath and reported thus: “Gervais denied closing the book on the church investigation, and insisted that it was still ongoing when police laid charges against Keeler in October 1991.”

As with post-2016 litigation involving Dale Crampton, Bishop John Beahan figured prominently in Keeler’s trial. According to a 2016 Ottawa Sun article: “One of Keeler’s victims told court that he saw Keeler apparently masturbating Beahan on a balcony at the summer camp.”

Ottawa news media in 2016 also noted that both Keeler and Dale Crampton had a history of working together. In 1974, Keeler and Crampton became the first two priests ever elected to the Ottawa Catholic School Board. Crampton collected more votes than any other trustee in that election. Both were re-elected as trustees in 1976.

=== William Allen ===
In 2010, Allen was charged with sexually assaulting two teenage brothers in the 1970s while working as a teacher at St. Pius X High School. According to news media reports, the court heard that Allen assaulted one of his victims weekly in the rectory of St. Monica Parish after choir practice. The other victim was assaulted by Allen at St.Pius X high school.

An Ontario court judge found Allen guilty in 2011. He was given a conditional nine-month sentence on account of his poor health. He died in December 2014.

Allen’s case is one more among the many (e.g., Crampton, Beahen, Keeler) involving sexual assault of minors occurring in the 1970s in the Ottawa Diocese during the tenure of Archbishop Joseph Plourde, whose own role remains unexamined.

=== Kenneth O'Keefe ===
In September 2012, Basilian order priest Kenneth O'Keefe, who taught at various Catholic schools in the Ottawa area, received a nine-month house arrest sentence after pleading guilty to inappropriately touching a 16-year-old who was a student at Ottawa's St. Pius high school during a sleepover at his apartment in 1974. In January 2013, O'Keefe received an additional sentence of nine months house arrest after pleading another "indecently assaulting" a then-17-year-old boy who was a student at Ottawa's St. Joseph's Catholic School over the course of four months between September and December, 1969 as well.

=== Archdiocese of Toronto ===
==== Angus Alexander McRae ====
In 1989, Priest Angus Alexander McRae, Archdiocese of Edmonton, Alberta (ordained June 5, 1954) was charged with the sexual abuse of two boys in Scarborough, Ontario. He spent several years with the Canadian Armed Forces as a military chaplain. In 1980 he attended court and was sentenced to four years for sexual abuse of a young boy. The charges, which included buggery, gross indecency and indecent assault, were laid and prosecuted by military police. He served the first ten months of his four-year sentence in the CFB military prison in Edmonton before being sent to Southdown, a treatment centre for Catholic clergy. After his release from Southdown, he was taken into the Archdiocese of Toronto by Archbishop Emmett Carter, and was recycled into St. Thomas More parish in Scarborough. In 1989, he was charged with abuse in Toronto and pleaded guilty. He was then placed on three years' probation. He later claimed that he only pled guilty to spare the families further embarrassment: "As much as I hated it and against my conscience and to save families further embarrassment I took it on the chin." McRae died at the Edmonton General Hospital on Friday, May 20, 2011.

==== William Hodgson Marshall ====
On April 30, 2020, the Canadian Supreme Court rejected an appeal from the Basilian Fathers of Toronto to not give victim Rod MacLeod a required payment of just over $2.5 million, including $500,000 in punitive damages, stemming from a sexual-assault case in the 1960s. MacLeod was abused by Father William Hodgson (Hod) Marshall, then a Basilian priest, when MacLeod was a student at St. Charles College high school in Sudbury. A jury had previously ordered the Basilian Fathers of Toronto to make the payment in April 2018 by a jury.

Marshall, who died in 2014 at the age of 92, pled guilty in 2011 to 16 counts of indecent assault of minors and one count of sexual assault for incidents that occurred between 1952 and 1986 when he taught at Assumption and Holy Names high schools in Windsor, plus other Catholic high schools in Toronto and Sudbury. He was sentenced to two years in prison, and served 16 months of his sentence before being released on probation in 2012. However, Marshall, who was given the nickname "Happy Hands" in the 1950s due to his tendency to touch students, later pled guilty to more sex abuse charges stemming from his time in Saskatchewan.

=== Diocese of London ===
The Roman Catholic Diocese of London, Ontario has been the source of several significant clergy sexual abuse scandals and cases within Canada. As has been the case in many Canadian and global dioceses, investigations and allegations revealed a pattern of sexual abuse and cover ups within the Diocese of London.

As of June 2018, at least 22 priests of the Diocese of London were known to be convicted, charged, or sued for the sexual abuse of children. In December 2019, the Survivors Network of those Abused by Priests of Southwest Ontario released a list of 36 "credibly accused" Catholic priests who were priests of the Diocese of London or committed sexual offences while serving within the diocese's jurisdiction. The list is limited to priests who sexually abused minors and not adults.

The current bishop's delegate for clergy sexual abuse is Reverend John Patrick Comiskey. The job of the bishop's delegate is to reach settlements with victims of clergy abuse on behalf of the diocese.

In response to public outcry and civil lawsuits, the Diocese of London started funding counselling for victims and survivors of clergy sexual abuse. In 2018, the Diocese changed its policies to restrict funding for and the availability of counselling.

==== Parish transfer and Priest Shuffling ====
The Diocese of London was responsible for some of the most well-known cases of "priest shuffling" in Canada, including that of Father Charles Henry Sylvestre and Father Barry Glendinning.

During the criminal investigation and legal proceedings against Father Charles Henry Sylvestre, it was revealed that the Diocese repeatedly "solved" all the complaints and accusations by moving Sylvestre to a new parish, including Bluewater, Ontario (where he was first reported), an unnamed place in Quebec, then Delhi, London, Windsor, Chatham-Kent and Pain Court (all in Ontario), where he made new victims.

Following his conviction for sexual abuse of multiple children, Glendinning was sent to Southdown, a treatment center for Catholic clergy. Glendinning was transferred to the Archdiocese of Edmonton in Alberta following his release from Southdown. He sexually abused several young boys while in Edmonton but no charges were laid. He was sent to Southdown again before being sent to the Archdiocese of Toronto. When parishioners found out about Glendinning's history, Archbishop Emmett Carter defended him until he was pressured to remove Glendinning from the parish. He was laicized in 2008.

==== Notable Legal Cases involving the Diocese of London ====
===== Lawsuits against Father Barry Glendinning =====
Glendinning's victims include John Swales and his two brothers, who were one of the first victims of clergy abuse within the Diocese of London to sue the Diocese. Swales and his brothers were abused by Glendinning in the 1970s when they were teenagers. Glendinning was convicted in relation to the abuse suffered by the Swales brothers. John Swales and his younger brothers filed a lawsuit in the late 1990s with respect to the abuse. Just under a decade after the start of their civil lawsuit, the Swales brothers were awarded $2.5 million in an out-of-court settlement for the abuse they suffered at the hands of Glendinning. This is the largest publicly known payment made by the Diocese of London to victims of clergy abuse within its diocese.

===== Father Charles Henry Sylvestre Trial and Appeal =====
In 1996, a lawsuit was filed against the Diocese of London by a woman named Irene Deschenes, alleging that Father Sylvestre sexually abused her when she was an elementary school student in the early 1970s. In 2000, the lawsuit was settled. During the criminal proceedings against Sylvestre in the 2000s, it was revealed that the Diocese had received reports dating back to 1962 of Sylvestre abusing three young girls. This information had not been provided to Deschenes during settlement discussions.

Deschenes went to court to request a re-opening of her lawsuit in light of the new information regarding the Diocese's prior knowledge and responsibility. In 2018, the Ontario Court of Justice ruled in Deschenes favour. The Diocese appealed the ruling. On May 21, 2020, the Ontario Court of Appeal dismissed the legal appeal. The Diocese then appealed to the Supreme Court of Canada. The Supreme Court also upheld the ruling in Deschene's favour and allowed her to continue with a new lawsuit against the Diocese.

===== The Roman Catholic Episcopal Corp v. AXA Insurance Canada =====
The Roman Catholic Episcopal Corp v. AXA Insurance Canada is a case commenced by the Diocese of London at the Ontario Superior Court of Justice. The diocese initiated the legal proceedings against the insurance company in 2008 after it refused to pay out claims in two sexual abuse cases. AXA Insurance filed a counterclaim seeking $10 million. The decade-long legal battle ended on June 20, 2018, when both sides reached an out-of-court settlement.

==== Abusive Priests in the Diocese of London ====
The following is a non-exhaustive list of priests of the Diocese of London who were convicted of sexual crimes. Civil lawsuits were filed against many of the convicted priests and the Diocese of London.

===== Charles Henry Sylvestre =====
In August 2006 Father Charles Henry Sylvestre (born 1922) of Belle River, Ontario pled guilty to 47 counts of sexual abuse on females between the ages of nine and fourteen between 1952 and 1989. Paul Bailey, the Crown Attorney for Chatham Kent, reportedly described the case as being the "largest case of non-residential school sex abuse by a Roman Catholic priest" in North America. Local newspapers documented the lives of many of the women who refused the publication ban and spoke out about their abuse. Sylvestre was given a three-year sentence in October 2006 and died January 22, 2007, of natural causes after only three months in prison. The case was documented by the Canadian Broadcasting Corporation new programme The Fifth Estate. On May 21, 2020, an Ontario appeals court dismissed a bid by the Diocese of London, where Sylvestre was employed, to drop a lawsuit filed by Irene Deschenes, who claimed that Sylvestre sexually abused her when she was a minor between 1970 and 1973. Deschenes began legal action against the Diocese of Ontario in 1996.

===== Father Barry Glendinning =====
In 1974, Barry Glendinning was charged and convicted of six counts of gross indecency involving five boys and one girl over a period of six years. Glendinning died on July 14, 2011.

===== Father Alfred Sasso =====
Alfred Francis Sasso pleaded guilty in 1980 to three counts of gross indecency involving three youths, one a former altar boy. He was sentenced to three months in jail. After his conviction, he was transferred to the Archdiocese of Vancouver in British Columbia. He died on September 27, 1991

===== Father John Harper =====
John Harper was a priest and teacher who sexually abused boys. He was known for hearing the boys' confessions immediately after each act of sex abuse. Harper was reported twice, once in the late 1960s to Church officials, and once in the early to mid 1970s to school officials. No action was taken until a victim went to police and he was charged in 1987. Harper was convicted in 1988 for sexual abuse and received a suspended sentence. In 2003, he pleaded guilty to another set of charges and received three years' probation.

===== Father Robert Morrissey =====
In the 1960s, Robert "Bob" Morrissey was a Christian Brother. He was known as "Brother Frederick". He supervised boys at St. John's Training School in Uxbridge, Ontario. The now defunct training school was rife with sexual, physical, and psychological abuse during its years of operation.

In 1969, Morrissey left the Christian Brothers and entered St. Peter's Seminary in London, Ontario. Morrissey was ordained in 1971 as a priest for the Diocese of London.

In 1992, charges of attempted buggery, indecent assault, gross indecency and assault causing bodily harm were laid against Morrissey. The charges were in relation to Morrissey's sexual abuse of students dating back to 1960 while he was at St. John's Training School. Morrissey was convicted and sentenced to 18 months in prison. Morrissey appealed the decision. The conviction on several charges of sex and physical abuse were set aside and a new trial was ordered. The appeal with respect to the conviction for one charge of physical abuse was dismissed.

===== Father Michael Francis White =====
In January 1994, Michael Francis White was pleaded guilty to one count of indecent assault against a young girl in Petrolia. The young female victim had gone to White to receive sexual assault counselling. White was sentenced to 18 months probation and served no jail time.

===== Father Gary Roy =====
In 1998, Gary Roy pleaded guilty to two counts of indecent assault of young boys. He was sentenced to four months in jail and three years' probation. The subject abuse dated back to the early 1980s. Roy died on June 19, 2001, shortly after pleading guilty. In August 2001, Bishop Ronald Fabbro of the Diocese of London requested that the Vatican defrock eight of its priests who had been convicted of sexual abuse of children. Roy was one of these eight priests.

===== Father John Stock =====
In 1998, John Gerald Stock (a.k.a. Gerry Stock a.k.a. Gerard Stock) pleaded guilty to sexually abusing a former altar boy. He received a conditional sentence to be served within the community of London, Ontario.

In September 1998, the Ontario Provincial Police laid 68 new charges against Stock. 34 counts of indecent assault and 34 counts of gross indecency were laid with respect to allegations of sexual abuse of 16 separate male victims. The alleged abuse spanned 22 years from 1959 to 1981. In December 1998, Stock pleaded guilty to all 34 counts of gross indecency. He was sentenced to two-years-less-a-day conditional sentence and 240 hours of community service. The sentence did not include any incarceration. There is some evidence that the Diocese was aware of Stock's propensity for or history of sexual abuse, including the fact that he received treatment for his sexual problems prior to the laying of any criminal charges.

In January 1999, Stock pleaded guilty for a new charge of sexual abuse of a former altar boy. The victim was 12 or 13 years old at the time of the abuse. The 12-month conditional sentence ran concurrent to the sentence of December 1998.

===== Father Ermete Nazzani =====
Father Ermete Nazzani (a.k.a. Father Herm) was a priest of the Scalabrinian Fathers, also known as the St. John The Baptist Province of The Fathers of St. Charles. In 2022, a lawsuit was filed alleging that he sexually abused an altar boy while he was a visiting priest at St. Angela Merici and St. Patrick's parishes in Windsor.

===== Father Cameron MacLean =====
In 1981, Bishop Sherlock was informed that MacLean was sexually abusing minor boys. Bishop Sherlock did not take any concrete action for almost two decades in response to these allegations. In 1997, MacLean was relieved of his duties at St. Theresa parish in Windsor. This decision was made just before the first charge of sexual abuse was laid against him. He was not laicized after the charges were laid. MacLean was later reinstated as a priest.

In July 1998, MacLean pleaded guilty to sexually abusing four young boys. Further charges were laid, including one charge of indecent assault in August 1998 and three counts of indecent assaults and three charges of buggery in October 1998. In October 2000, MacLean pleaded guilty to charges related to his sexual abuse of eight different boys in the 1970s and 1980s.

== Sexual Abuse Cases in Nova Scotia ==
On August 7, 2009, bishop Raymond Lahey announced that the Diocese of Antigonish had reached a $15 million settlement in a class action lawsuit filed by victims of sexual abuse by diocese priests dating back to 1950. On September 15, 2009, he was arrested at the Ottawa airport after the border services agency uncovered hundreds of unlawful images (child pornography) on his laptop computer. Lahey was "sentenced to 15 months in prison and two years' probation, but received a two-for-one credit for the time he served".

== Sexual Abuse Cases in Saskatchewan ==
In 2013, convicted Ontario Basilian priest William Hodgson ("Hod") Marshall received a six-month house arrest sentence after pleading guilty to sexually assaulting two Saskatoon boys in 1959 and 1961.

== Sexual Abuse Cases in Quebec ==
The institution Collège Notre-Dame du Sacré-Cœur came into the public eye for a multitude of sex abuse cases and cover-ups spanning more than the second half of the 20th century.

In December 2012, it was reported that a deacon at a congregation in Beaconsfield, Quebec, and "a spokesperson for the Catholic Church on issues of child abuse", was charged with possession and distribution of child pornography after police seized more than 2,000 photos, as well as computers and hard drives, at locations in Beaconsfield and Pointe-Claire.

In April 2023, the Quebec Court of Appeal approved a Canadian $ 38 million settlement between the Canadian province of the Clerics of Saint Viator, a teaching order, and 375 victims of sexual abuse, after the plaintiffs' lawyers agreed to reduce their fees by about 20%.

== Sexual Abuse Cases in Nunavut ==
On September 12, 2014, de-frocked Catholic priest Eric Dejaeger (born April 24, 1947, ordained in 1978) "was convicted of 24 counts of indecent assault, one of unlawful confinement, two of buggery, three of unlawful sexual intercourse, one of sexual assault and one of bestiality" that he committed during his time in the priesthood in the Roman Catholic mission in Igloolik, between 1978 and 1982. He had already been convicted for 11 counts of sexual assault and indecent assault against children at his previous post in Baker Lake, Nunavut.

== Allegation against former nuncio ==
On 22 February 2019, a Canadian man, Christian Vachon, claimed that former nuncio to Canada Luigi Ventura had touched him improperly in July 2008 when he was 32. Vachon said Ventura's successor as Nuncio to Canada, Archbishop Luigi Bonazzi, called him the day he registered his complaint to discuss it. On July 23, 2020, it was reported that Ventura, who is facing trial in France for later sex abuse allegations, was still under investigation for the alleged 2008 incident in Ottawa.

== Residential schools ==
By 1912, thousands of First Nations children attended residential schools, many of which were run by the Catholic Church. In 1990, Manitoba leader Phil Fontaine revealed that he had been sexually and physically abused in a Catholic residential school. He claimed that sexual abuse was common in residential schools in general. "In my grade three class, if there were 20 boys, every single one of them would have experienced what I experienced. They would have experienced some aspect of sexual abuse." Canadian author and artist, Michael D. O'Brien, has also spoken out about his painful experiences of residential school abuse, revealing that "the sexual exploitation of the young has been epidemic in Catholic residential schools and orphanages."

== See also ==
Sexual abuse cases in catholic church

- Catholic Church sexual abuse cases
- Catholic Church sexual abuse cases by country
- William Kamm, leader of schismatic Catholic group convicted for sexual abuse

Critique & consequences related topics

- Criticism of Pope John Paul II
- Debate on the causes of clerical child abuse
- Ecclesiastical response to Catholic sexual abuse cases
- Instruction Concerning the Criteria for the Discernment of Vocations with Regard to Persons with Homosexual Tendencies in View of Their Admission to the Seminary and to Holy Orders
- Media coverage of Catholic sex abuse cases
- Settlements and bankruptcies in Catholic sex abuse cases
- Sex Crimes and the Vatican, BBC documentary

Investigation, prevention and victim support related topics

- Pontifical Commission for the Protection of Minors
- Sexual Addiction & Compulsivity, peer-reviewed journal on prevention & treatment
- Vos estis lux mundi, church procedure for abuse cases

Other related topics

- Child sexual abuse
- Clerical celibacy
- Homosexual clergy in the Catholic Church
- List of youth detention incidents in Canada
- Pontifical secret
