= What Was Asked of Us =

2006 oral history book by Trish Wood

- Author: Trish Wood
- Publisher: Little, Brown and Company
- Publication date: 2006
- ISBN: 0-316-01670-5

What Was Asked of Us: An Oral History of the Iraq War by the Soldiers Who Fought It is a 2006 book presenting the oral history of soldiers who participated in the Iraq War. It was written by Trish Wood, an award-winning author who has been honoured by the Canadian Association of Journalists, among other organizations. Its interviews are a qualitative approach to documenting the war.
