= Crescent Heights High School (Calgary) =

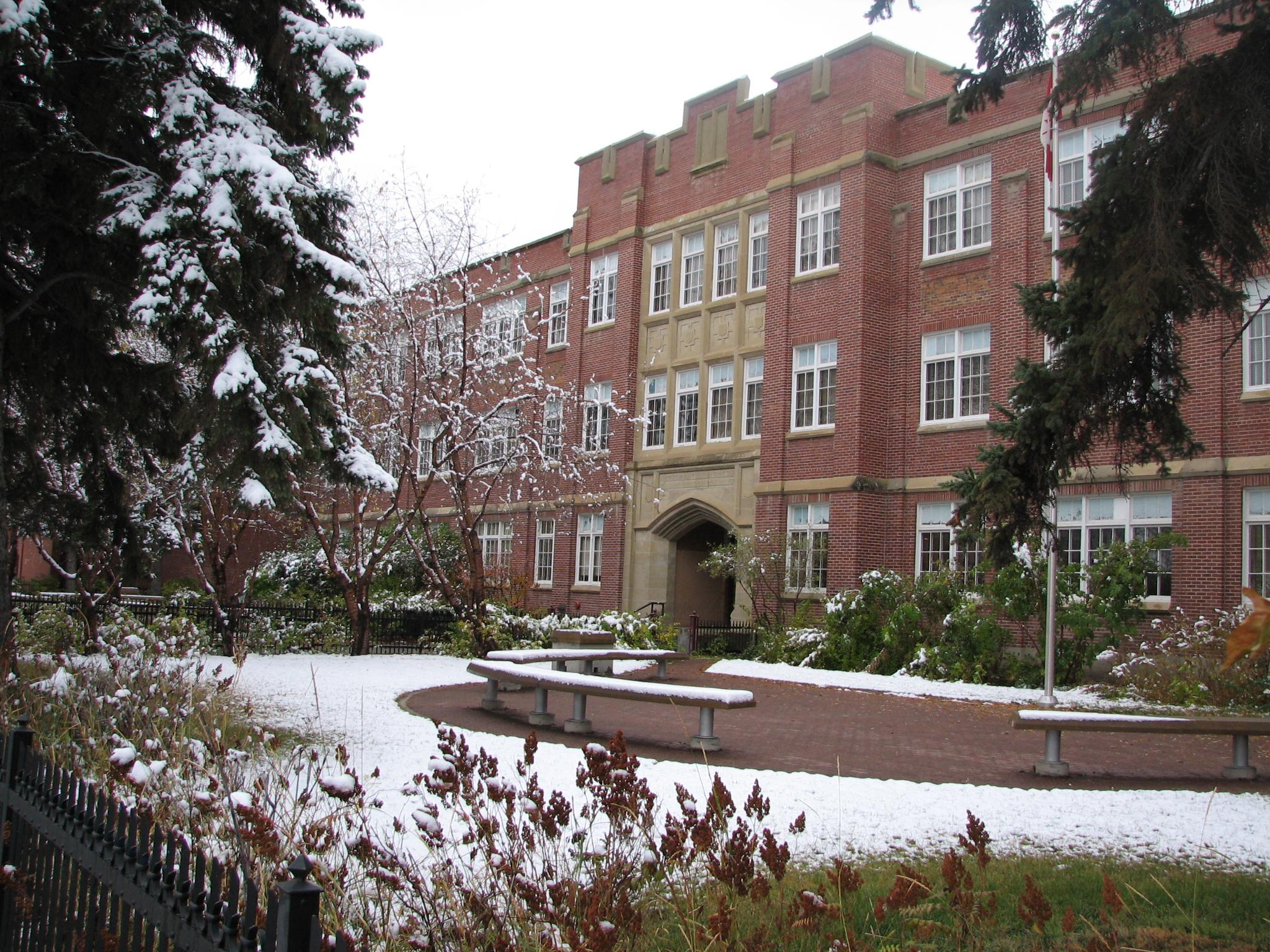

Location
- 1019 1st Street N.W. Calgary, Alberta, T2M 2S2; Canada; 51.061546°N 114.065631°W

Information
- School type: Public secondary
- Motto: Crescit Eundo (Latin for: We progress as we grow)
- Established: 1915
- School board: Calgary Board of Education
- Principal: Joel Leavitt
- Grades: 10–12
- Enrollment: 1597 (2024-2025)
  - Grade 10: 517
  - Grade 11: 530
  - Grade 12: 550
- Colours: Navy, Red, and White
- Mascot: Cowboy Sam
- Team name: Cowboys
- Communities served: Crescent Heights, Coventry Hills, Hidden Valley, Crossroads, Mt Pleasant, Renfrew, Sunnyside, Mayland Heights, Vista Heights, Bridgeland, Tuxedo Park, Rosedale
- Website: crescentheights.cbe.ab.ca
- Last updated: March 2, 2025

Crescent Heights High School is a high school with an enrollment of 1934 students in grades 10–12 in Calgary, Alberta, Canada. The school is part of the Calgary Board of Education's public school system.

== History ==
In 1915, Crescent Heights High School was called Crescent Heights Collegiate Institute, and was located in what is now Balmoral School. By 1919, enrollment at Crescent Heights High School was 980 students. The current building was erected in 1928 for a cost of $275,000. It was extensively renovated in 1985–86, with a second full-size gymnasium added, and the original gymnasium converted into a student center. The basement lunch room was converted into a theater and a Building shop was later turned into a Dance room.

The school is a member of the Action for Bright TUTTA Society.

== Notable staff ==
- The first principal of Crescent Heights from 1915 to 1935 was William Aberhart, Premier of Alberta 1935-1943.
- Another early teacher was Douglas Scott Harkness, who commanded an Anti-Tank Regiment of the Royal Canadian Artillery in the Second World War and served as Minister of National Defence after the war.

== Filmography ==
In 2015, the Movie "Burn your Maps" was partially filmed at Crescent Heights in the Summer of 2015

In 2021, The TV Series "Highschool" Season 1 featuring Tegan and Sara was filmed at Crescent Heights during the Spring Break.

== Notable alumni ==
- Doris Anderson - Former editor of Chatelaine magazine.
- Paul Brandt - Country music artist
- Garrett Camp - Co-founder of Uber and StumbleUpon. Graduated in 1996.
- George Chahal - Canadian politician who is the Member of Parliament for Calgary Skyview. He served as the Councillor for Ward 5 on the Calgary City Council from 2017 to 2021.
- Sean Cheesman - International dance choreographer
- Tommy Chong - Comedian/Actor
- Michael Clarkson – Journalist, Centre for Investigative Journalism Award recipient
- Thomas Glenn - GRAMMY Award-winning operatic tenor.
- Eric Greif - Lawyer and entertainment personality
- Akeem Haynes - Part of Canada's bronze medal-winning Men's 4 × 100 metres relay team in the Rio 2016 Olympic Games
- Violet King Henry - The first black person to graduate law in Alberta and to be admitted to the Alberta Bar, as well as the first black female lawyer in Canada.
- Ralph Klein - The 12th Premier of Alberta, started at Crescent Heights, later graduated from Viscount Bennett High School
- Rizwan Manji - Portrayed Rajiv on the show Outsourced
- Janet Mitchell - artist
- Tegan and Sara Quin - Indie rock/New Wave/Indie Pop musicians, Graduated from Crescent Heights High School in 1998
- George Salt (1903–2003), English entomologist and ecologist, who spent most of his youth in Alberta
- Ron Southern - Founder of ATCO Group, Sentgraf Enterprises, Canadian Utilities, Spruce Meadows and AKITA drilling
- Ken Taylor - Former Canadian ambassador to Iran, who helped several Americans escape during the Iran hostage crisis.
- 82 Former Crescent Heights High School students are recognized by a memorial and simulated eternal flame in the school foyer as having given their lives in military service in the Second World War.
