= Michael Clarkson (journalist) =

Canadian journalist, author, and speaker

- Born: 1948 or 1949 (age 76–77); Preston, Lancashire, England, U.K.
- Occupation: Journalist
- Years active: 1967–present
- Awards: Centre for Investigative Journalism Award 1986; National Newspaper Award 1988 1992

Michael Clarkson is a Canadian journalist, author, and speaker.

== Early life ==
Clarkson was born in Preston, Lancashire. He moved with his family to Fort Erie, Ontario, at an early age, where he attended Mather Elementary School and became life-long friends with his schoolmate and future poet Robert Billings. He attended Crescent Heights High School in Calgary, Alberta, with future Premier of Alberta Ralph Klein.

A sufferer of chronic depression, Clarkson identified with Holden Caulfield, the protagonist in J. D. Salinger's The Catcher in the Rye, and developed an obsession with both the character and the author.

== Career ==
Clarkson began his journalism career in 1967 as a freelance newspaper writer. He moved to Niagara Falls, Ontario, when his freelancing career fell apart, and collected welfare for several months before getting a job at the Niagara Falls Review. In 1978, his depression led him to Cornish, New Hampshire, to try to meet his favorite author, J. D. Salinger, who had famously retreated from public life after giving his last interview in 1953. He had a brief conversation with an uncooperative Salinger at the base of his driveway, then returned unannounced a year later to speak some more with Salinger in his home. Clarkson wrote an article about his two visits that he sold to The New York Times Syndicate for $1,500.

Clarkson spent the 1980s working at the St. Catharines Standard. In 1985, he worked with Kevin Cavanagh, Doug Herod, and Kevin McMahon on a series of stories about the mass arrest of 32 men charged for sex offenses committed in a St. Catharines shopping mall washroom leading to one man committing suicide. The series led to changes in the city's police procedures for handling such offenses. The following year, the stories earned the four reporters the inaugural Centre for Investigative Journalism Award for excellence in investigative journalism.

Clarkson's work with fellow reporter John Nicol earned the two an honorable mention from the National Newspaper Awards and two awards from the Western Ontario Newspaper Awards. In 1989, Clarkson received the 1988 National Newspaper Award for Sports Writing for a feature article about hockey legend Hap Emms. It was the Standard's first National Newspaper Award. After leaving the newspaper, Clarkson received the 1990 Western Ontario Newspaper Award for News Feature for an article published the previous year in the Standard on the stress suffered by police who investigate their colleagues, and he was also runner-up in the Humor Writing and Beat Coverage categories.

In 1990, Clarkson moved to the Calgary Herald. He received an honorable mention in 1991 from the Western Fairs Association for a behind-the-scenes article about the Calgary Stampede. Articles about the AIDS-related deaths of 40 male figure skaters and coaches earned Clarkson the 1992 National Newspaper Award for Sports Writing.

Clarkson and Sharon Adams wrote a series of several articles published in the spring of 1994 called "Coping with Change" about how the people of Calgary, Alberta, were coping with a sluggish economy. The series earned the two reporters the 1995 Media Awards for Excellence in Health Reporting from the Canadian Nurses Association.

Also in 1994, Clarkson and Ron Collins wrote a series of stories revealing how the health care system was destroying the lives of native Canadians by making it easy for them to abuse prescription drugs. The series led the Alberta College of Physicians and Surgeons to charge Calgary physician Dr. Dionisio David with improperly prescribing drugs. David resigned to avoid the charges. The series was a finalist for both the (U.S.) National Institute of Health Care Management Award for International Health-care Reporting and the 1995 Canadian Association of Journalists award in the open newspaper category.

Clarkson moved to the Toronto Star in 1995. He took a buyout and retired from the newspaper in 2004.

After officially retiring, Clarkson spent his time writing books and speaking on mental health. In 2020, he wrote and produced a documentary on suicides at Niagara Falls that focused on the death of his friend and poet, Robert Billings.

== Personal life ==
Clarkson and his wife Jennifer married in 1974. They have two children.

In addition to chronic depression, Clarkson also suffered from occasional vasovagal attacks, a common form of fainting spells.

During the 1980s, Clarkson participated in rescue missions for people who went over Niagara Falls.

== Honors ==
- 1986 Centre for Investigative Journalism Award for best piece of investigative reporting in print, shared with Kevin Cavanagh, Doug Herod, and Kevin McMahon, St. Catharines Standard
- 1987 National Newspaper Award honorable mention for Enterprise Reporting, shared with John Nicol, St. Catharines Standard
- 1988 Western Ontario Newspaper Awards' Sault Star award for News Feature, shared with John Nicol, St. Catharines Standard
- 1988 Western Ontario Newspaper Award for Family Section Feature Writing, shared with John Nicol, St. Catharines Standard
- 1988 National Newspaper Award for Sports Writing, St. Catharines Standard, for a feature story on Hap Emms and his family.
- 1990 Western Ontario Newspaper Award for News Feature, St. Catharines Standard, for an article on the stress suffered by police who investigate their colleagues.
- 1991 Western Fairs Association Award honorable mention for print, Calgary Herald, for a behind the scenes look at the Calgary Stampede.
- 1992 National Newspaper Award for Sports Writing, Calgary Herald, for stories on the AIDS-related deaths of 40 male figure skaters and coaches.
- 1995 Media Awards for Excellence in Health Reporting from the Canadian Nurses Association, shared with Sharon Adams, Calgary Herald, for the series "Coping with Change" on finding solutions to Calgarian's problems experienced as a result of changing times.

== Selected bibliography ==
=== Articles ===
- "The Catcher in the Rye grows old in solitude", November 1979,
- "Skating's Spectre", Calgary Herald, December 13, 1992, winner of the 1992 National Newspaper Award for Sports Writing
- "Deaths create massive vacuum", Calgary Herald, December 13, 1992, winner of the 1992 National Newspaper Award for Sports Writing
- "Coping with Change" series, Calgary Herald, winner of a 1995 Media Award for Excellence in Health Reporting
  - "Coping: Then and Now", March 12, 1994
  - "Proof Positive", March 12, 1994
  - "Survival Tactics", March 20, 1994
  - "A Matter of Balance", March 26, 1994
  - "Job loss opens doors", March 26, 1994
  - "Retiree crafts a new life", March 26, 1994
  - "Adapt or Perish", March 31, 1994
  - "Pulling Together", April 23, 1994

=== Books ===
- Competitive Fire: Insights to Developing the Warrior Mentality of Sports Champions (1999)
- Intelligent Fear: How to Make Fear Work for You (2002)
- Pressure Golf: Overcoming Choking and Frustration (2003)
- Quick Fixes for Everyday Fears: How to Manage Everything from Fear of Change to Fear of Flying (2004)
- When Beds Float: Examining The Poltergeist Enigma (2005)
- Poltergeist: Examining Mysteries of the Paranormal (2006)
- The Secret Life of Glenn Gould: A Genius in Love (2010)
- The Poltergeist Phenomenon: An In-depth Investigation Into Floating Beds, Smashing Glass, and Other Unexplained Disturbances (2011)
- The Age of Daredevils (2016)
- The River of Lost Souls (2017)

== Selected filmography ==
- Superman II (1980), extra
- At the Brink: A Personal Look at Suicide Over Niagara Falls (2020), producer and writer
