= Centre for Investigative Journalism Award =

Canadian journalism award (1986–1990)

The Centre for Investigative Journalism Award (1986–1990) was given for excellence in investigative journalism by Canadian journalists. It was administered by the Canadian Centre for Investigative Journalism (CIJ).

== History ==
Founded in 1978, CIJ began giving the awards in 1986. The inaugural awards had just two categories: print and broadcast. The categories were refined in 1987 to be newspaper, magazine, television, and radio. The 1990 awards split the newspaper category into open newspaper and small newspaper, and the radio and television categories were each split into network and regional. They were the final awards given under the organization's name before it was changed to the Canadian Association of Journalists (CAJ) the day after the awards ceremony. The CAJ continued giving awards from 1991 onward under its new name.

== 1986 Awardees ==
=== Broadcast ===
- Eric Malling, The Fifth Estate

He was honored for an investigation into the federal government's decision to allow StarKist to ship cans of tainted tuna from its Saint Andrews, New Brunswick. Fisheries minister John Fraser resigned as a consequence of the report, and millions of cans of tuna were recalled.

Video:

"Product of Canada", September 17, 1985

- Honorable Mention: Pierre Leduc, CFCF-TV

He was honored for a story about a vendetta against a lawyer in Quebec City, Quebec, by other lawyers.

=== Print ===
- Kevin Cavanagh, Michael Clarkson, Doug Herod, and Kevin McMahon, St. Catharines Standard

They were honored for a series of articles on the mass arrest of 32 men who were charged with committing sex offenses in a washroom at a shopping mall in St. Catharines, Ontario. The St. Catharines police department changed its procedures for handling such offenses as a result of the series.

- Honorable Mention: Brian Power and Nicole Parton, The Vancouver Sun

They were honored for a story about a yougurt-like milk culture sold as a cancer and cosmetic treatment.

Story:

"U.S. pyramid fleece hits city", July 26, 1985

- Honorable Mention: Linda Diebel, Montreal Gazette

She was honored for a story on Canadian banks involved in money laundering in the Bahamas.

Story:

"Bahamians ask probe of Canada's banks and drugs", October 22, 1985

- Honorable Mention: Elaine Dewar, Canadian Business

She was honored for her series on Unicorp's takeover of Union Enterprises.

- Honorable Mention: Kate Dunn, Calgary Herald

She was honored for a story on a scam arising from federal scientific research tax credits.

Story:

"At one time, Albion boss 'was on the street'", June 22, 1985

- Horoable Mention: Jock Furguson, The Globe and Mail

He was honored for a series on pollution in Sarnia, Ontario.

== 1987–1989 Awardees ==
=== Magazine ===
- 1987: Carolyn Walton, Harrowsmith

She was honored for her story on the dangers of a fungus found in many older Canadian homes.

Article:

"Bucolic Plague", March–April 1986

- 1988: Paul McKay, Harrowsmith

He was honored for a report on Canadian and U.S. wildlife officers pursuing a fictitious falcon smuggling ring in the Yukon.

Article:

"Operation Falcon", November–December 1987

- 1988 Honorable Mention: Michael Webster, Harrowsmith

He was honored for an article on lawsuits related to odor problems on farms.

Article:

"Law and Odour", January–February 1987

- 1988 Honorable Mention: Andrew Nikiforuk, Saturday Night

He was honored for a report on labor unrest in Edmonton during the Gainer's strike.

- 1988 Honorable Mention: Stephen Kimber and Kelly Shiers, Cities Magazine (Halifax, Nova Scotia)

They were honored for a story about a botched search in Nova Scotia for a little boy lost in the woods.

- 1989: Andrew Nikiforuk, Report on Business

He was honored for an article on the decline of the prairie wheat economy.

=== Newspaper ===
- 1987: David Prosser and Ian Hamilton, The Kingston Whig-Standard

They were honored for their stories about five Soviet Red Army deserters they interviewed in Afghanistan who were being held captive by rebel Afghan forces, the soldier's petition for asylum in Canada, and the aborted mission to rescue them. The reporters worked with the Department of External Affairs and International Trade to liberate the soldiers and bring them to Canada, and delayed publication of their stories until the soldiers were safe.

Stories in Series:
1. "How bid to save six Soviet POWs in Afghanistan turned into fiasco", printed in The Leader Post on April 21, 1986
2. "Why bid to save Soviet PoWs failed", printed in The Leader-Post on April 22, 1986

- 1987 Honorable Mention: Andrew McIntosh, The Globe and Mail

He was honored for a five-part series describing the politics and costs of picking a federal prison site in Prime Minister Brian Mulrooney's riding.

- 1987 Honorable Mention: Andre Noel, La Presse

He was honored for a report comparing the academic performance of students in Quebec and their counterparts in Europe.

- 1987 Honorable Mention: Reporting staff of the Star-Phoenix, including Verne Clemence, Earl Fowler, Deanna Herman, Kim Humphries, Gerry Klein, Daryl Oshanek, Bill Peterson, Sheila Robertson, Lorraine Stewart, Gary Taljit, Clarence Trotchie, Kathryn Warden, Peter Wilson, and Dave Yanko

They were honored for their stories on the poor living conditions of the native population in Saskatoon, Saskatchewan.

Special Report:

"Natives in Saskatoon: A People Apart", October 7, 1986

- 1988: Jock Ferguson and Paul Taylor, The Globe and Mail

They were honored for a report alleging secret financial transactions between Toronto municipal politicians, lawyers, and developers.

- 1988 Honorable Mention: Peter Moon, The Globe and Mail

He was honored for a report on Canadian lawbreakers on St. Kitts.

- 1988 Honorable Mention: Neil Macdonald, The Ottawa Citizen

He was honored for a report on problems within the Canadian Security Intelligence Service.

Story:

"CSIS: Making a cop into a spy just doesn't fly", July 4, 1987

- 1988 Honorable Mention: Stevie Cameron, The Globe and Mail

She was honored for a story on the amounts the PC Canada fund paid for decorating the prime minister's residence.

- 1988 Honorable Mention: Claude Arpin, The Gazette

He was honored for his account of real estate flipping that greatly increased the price of an Oerlikon Aerospace land purchase. The day after the story was published, Prime Minister Brian Mulrooney fired André Bissonnette, the minister of small business, and ordered the RCMP to open an investigation because of the suspicious timing of the transactions relative to Oerlikon being awarded a government contract.

Story:

"How real-estate 'flip' forced up firm's cost for land", January 17, 1987

- 1989: Jock Furguson and Dawn King, The Globe and Mail

They were honored for an eight-part series examining the links between municipal politicians and developers in a Toronto suburb.

Series:

"Behind the Boom – the Story of York Region"

- 1989 Honorable Mention: Bob Sarti, Chris Rose, and Kim Pemberton, The Vancouver Sun

They were honored for a story about a three month investigation into links between Vancouver barber Gilbert Paul Jordan and the alcohol-relate deaths of at least nine native women he got drunk for sexual gratification. Jordan was convicted of manslaughter the day before the series was published, and later sentenced to 15 years.

Series:

"Death by Alcohol", October 22, 1988

Stories in Series:
1. "Race bias charged in Jordan case"
2. "A life of empty bottles"
3. "A life on the wrong side of the law"
4. "Crimes and Punishment"
5. "5 years of violence in Prince George"
6. "He's the scariest man I've ever met, prosecutor says"
7. "Bodies in the barbershop"
8. "Drinking party leads to suspect"
9. "Alcohol as a lethal weapon: a legal first in Canada?"
10. "She's just the cleaning lady"
11. "Down the hatch, honey"
12. "The better side of a bad man"

=== Radio ===
- 1987: Larry Powell, CBC Radio

He was honored for a story about a government and industry coverup of uranium spills at Wollaston Lake in northern Saskatchewan.

- 1988: Martha Honey, Sunday Morning

She was honored for her report on the "drugs for guns" scandal in the Iran–Contra affair.

- 1988 Honorable Mention: Stephen Wadhams, Sunday Morning

He was honored for a story on Canadian servicemen held in North Africa and French prisoners of war who were never recognized by the Canadian government.

- 1988 Honorable Mention: Susan Cardinal, Sunday Morning

She was honored for a vivid chronicle of an AIDS patient's final six months of life.

=== Television ===
- 1987: Pierre Leduc, CFCF-TV

He was honored for a story on industrial accidents in Quebec resulting from poor labor safety standards enforcement.'

- 1988: Brian Stewart, The Journal

He was honored for his ground breaking report on the Air India Flight 182 crash.

- 1988 Honorable Mention: Pierre Leduc, CFCF-TV

He was honored for a story on Barney Senez's 21-year solo fight against corruption.

- 1988 Honorable Mention: 24-hour investigative team at CBC Winnipeg

They were honored for a story showing that the government's new penalties for drunk driving were not working.

== 1990 Awardees ==
=== Magazine ===
- Andrew Nikiforuk and Ed Struzik, Report on Business

Story:

"The Great Forest Sell-Off"

=== Network Radio ===
- Penny Clark, Jay Ingram, Anita Gordon, Quirks and Quarks

Story:

"The Race Science of Philippe Rushton"

=== Open Newspaper ===
- Linda McQuaig, The Globe and Mail

She was honored for stories about the Patti Starr affair.

=== Regional Radio ===
- Bill Smith and Peter Puxley, CBC Manitoba

Story:

"A Room with No Doors"

=== Small Newspaper ===
- Philip Lee, Michael Harris, and the Staff of The Sunday Express

They were awarded for investigating sexual abuse at Mount Cashel Orphanage.

Story:

"Unheard Cries: The Burial of Sexual Abuse at Mt. Cashel Orphanage"

=== Network Television ===
- Eric Malling, Sarah Spinks, and Cathy Forrest, The Fifth Estate

They were honored for a report on Saskatchewan's Bosco Homes for troubeled children.

=== Regional Television ===
- BCTV

Story:

"Knight Street Pub Controversy"
