= Andrew Nikiforuk =

Canadian journalist

Andrew Nikiforuk (born 1955) is a Canadian journalist and author. His writing has appeared in many outlets, including Saturday Night, Maclean's, Alberta Views, Alternatives Journal, and national newspapers. He has won multiple National Magazine Awards for his work. In 1990, the Toronto Star awarded him an Atkinson Fellowship in Public Policy to study AIDS and the failure of public health policy. He has also published numerous books, including Saboteurs: Wiebo Ludwig's War Against Oil, which won the Governor General's Award in 2002 and Tar Sands: Dirty Oil and the Future of a Continent, which won the Rachel Carson Environment Book Award for 2008-09 from the Society of Environmental Journalists.

In 2010, Nikiforuk became The Tyee's first writer in residence.

== Awards ==
- 1989: Centre for Investigative Journalism Award in the magazine category for a 1988 article in Report on Business about the decline of the prairie wheat economy.
- 1990: Centre for Investigative Journalism Award in the magazine category that he shared with Ed Struzik for the 1989 article "The Great Forest Sell-Off" in Report on Business.
- 2002: Governor General's Literary Award for Non-fiction for Saboteurs: Wiebo Ludwig's War Against Oil
- 2009: Rachel Carson Environment Book Award for Tar Sands: Dirty Oil and the Future of a Continent

== Books ==
- School's Out: The Catastrophe in Public Education and What We Can Do About It, Macfarlane Walter & Ross, 1993, Hardcover, 207 pages, 978-0-92191-248-4
- Fourth Horseman: A Short History of Epidemics, Plagues, Famines & Other Scourges, Viking Canada, 1991, Hardcover, 200 pages, 978-0-67083-122-7
- Saboteurs: Wiebo Ludwig's War Against Big Oil, Macfarlane, Walter & Ross, 2002, Paperback, 296 pages, 978-1-55199-101-6
- Pandemonium: Bird Flu, Mad Cow Disease and Other Biological Plagues of the 21st Century, Viking Canada (AHC), Hardcover, 320 pages, 978-0-67004-519-8
- Tar Sands: Dirty Oil and the Future of a Continent, Greystone Books, April 2010, paperback, 208 pages, ISBN 978-1-55365-555-8
- Empire of the Beetle: How Human Folly and a Tiny Bug Are Killing North America's Great Forests, Greystone Books, August 2011, paperback, 240 pages, ISBN 978-1-55365-510-7
- The Energy of Slaves: Oil and the New Servitude, Greystone Books, September 2012, hardcover, 296 pages, ISBN 978-1-55365-978-5
- Nikiforuk, Andrew (2015). Slick Water: Fracking and One Insider's Stand Against the World's Most Powerful Industry. Vancouver: Greystone Books. ISBN 978-1-77164-076-3.
