= Ewart John Arlington Harnum =

Lieutenant Governor of Newfoundland

The Honourable Ewart John Arlington Harnum
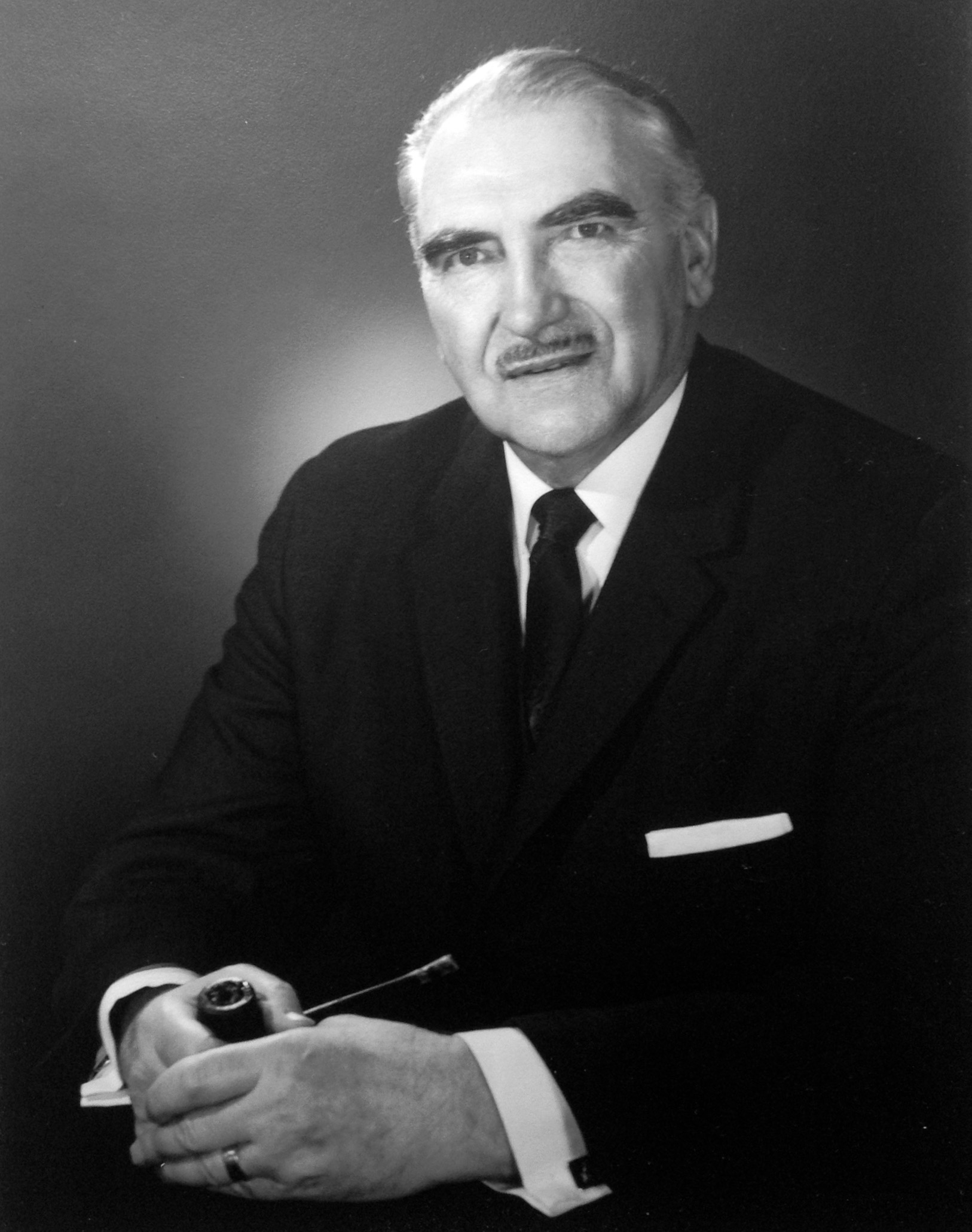

5th Lieutenant Governor of Newfoundland
- In office April 2, 1969 – July 2, 1974
- Monarch: Elizabeth II
- Governors General: Roland Michener; Jules Léger
- Premier: Joey Smallwood; Frank Moores
- Preceded by: Fabian O'Dea
- Succeeded by: Gordon Arnaud Winter

Personal details
- Born: October 13, 1910 Sound Island, Placentia Bay, Dominion of Newfoundland
- Died: February 29, 1996 (aged 85) St. John's, Newfoundland

Ewart John Arlington Harnum (October 13, 1910 – February 29, 1996) was a Canadian businessman and the fifth lieutenant governor of Newfoundland from 1969 to 1974.

Born on Sound Island in Placentia Bay, Newfoundland, Harnum was educated at Bishop Feild College, St. John's. His business background was in insurance, as he worked for Dale and Company Limited, followed by Bowring Insurance, Mutual Life Insurance of Canada and finally W.U. Knowling Insurance Limited. Harnum then established his own business, Harnum Insurance Agencies.

Harnum was very active in the community and served on many boards. Following is a list of his many accomplishments:

- President, Newfoundland Board of Insurance Underwriters,
- President, Newfoundland Insurance Agents Association,
- first President, Insurance Institution of Newfoundland,
- Mason, Grand Lodge of Scotland A.F. and A.M.,
- District Grand Master, Grand Lodge of Scotland,
- honorary Junior Grand Warden, Grand Lodge of Scotland,
- Provincial Grand Master, Royal Order of Scotland,
- honorary Senior Grand Warden, Royal Order of Scotland,
- Knight of Grace, Priory of St. John of Jerusalem,
- President, St. John Ambulance,
- Doctor of Laws (Honoris Causa), Memorial University of Newfoundland,
- Chairman, Canadian Games for the Physically Disabled,
- member, St. John's Board of Trade
- member, St. Thomas Anglican Church.

== See also ==
- List of people of Newfoundland and Labrador
