= Patrick Kelly (RCMP officer) =

Canadian police officer and convicted murderer

Patrick Kelly is a former Royal Canadian Mounted Police undercover agent and convicted murderer. He was an officer in Toronto's drug squad based in Toronto at the Toronto RCMP Building in the early 1970s.

== Murder of Jeannette Kelly ==
In 1984, Kelly was convicted of the first-degree murder of his wife Jeannette Kelly by throwing her from the 17th floor balcony of The Palace Pier high-rise on Sunday, March 29, 1981, in Toronto, Canada. He stated to police that he had seen his wife on the balcony, reaching out over the rail to investigate a rattle. Kelly testified she then slipped and fell to her death. At Kelly's trial, the Crown had evidence that he was working with organized crime, namely money laundering. The prosecution experts testified that the great distance between the edifice and the location of Mrs. Kelly's body could have only occurred if she was strongly pushed.

== Arrest and parole ==
Kelly was arrested for his wife's murder on March 2, 1983. His trial began in April 1984. He was convicted by a jury and was sentenced to life in prison with parole eligibility after 25 years. The trial was covered extensively by Ontario and Canadian national news outlets. He was imprisoned at the federal inmate intake unit at Millhaven Institution for several years as a security precaution due to his past as an RCMP officer. He was eventually transferred to William Head Institution on Vancouver Island in British Columbia.

Kelly was given parole in May 2010.

== Parole revoked ==
In November 2012, Kelly's federal parole was revoked, mainly because he had too many secretive relationships with women that he failed to disclose to the Parole Board. He was returned to federal prison. In 2016, he was given day parole and allowed to reside in Victoria, B.C.

== Books and movies ==
In 2007, the second printing edition of the book A Master of Deception: Working Undercover for the RCMP by Robert Knuckle was published by General Store. The book gives a detailed account of the murder and the investigative process.

The 1996 book The Judas Kiss: The Undercover Life of Patrick Kelly by journalist Michael Harris relates the real story of Patrick Kelly.

The 1999 TV movie Murder Most Likely starring Paul Gross as Patrick Kelly was nominated for the 2000 Gemini Award for best TV Movie or Dramatic Mini-Series. The movie is based on Michael Harris's book The Judas Kiss: The Undercover Life of Patrick Kelly.
