= Samuel Hughes (judge) =

Canadian judge (1913–2002)

Lieutenant-Colonel Samuel H. S. Hughes, QC (1913–2002) was a Canadian lawyer who served as a justice of the Supreme Court of Ontario. He had a less well-known background as a Canadian military historian during the Second World War.

Shortly after retiring as a judge he took on the task of chairing a Royal Commission known as the Hughes Inquiry into allegations of child abuse by members of the Christian Brothers of Ireland at Mount Cashel Orphanage in Newfoundland.

== Early life ==
Born in 1913, Hughes was the only son of Garnet Hughes, who commanded the 1st and 5th Canadian Infantry Divisions during the First World War, by his marriage to Elizabeth Irene Bayliss Newling in 1910. He was named after his grandfather Sir Sam Hughes, Canadian Minister of Militia and Defence during that war. Thanks to the war, he grew up in the United Kingdom, accompanying his father, and they returned to Canada in 1928, when Garnet Hughes ended his military career and returned to life as an engineer. Sam Hughes was then educated at Upper Canada College and the University of Toronto, and then proceeded to Oxford, with a Massey College Scholarship. His subject was history, and he graduated from Oxford with no particular career in mind.

Hughes's father died in 1937, and he returned to Canada. He tried teaching, and then in 1939 began to read for a law degree at Osgoode Hall, Toronto.

== Second World War career ==
With the arrival of the Second World War joined the Officers' Training Corps and was commissioned as a lieutenant into The Queen's Own Rifles of Canada. He was posted to England in the winter of 1941 and then to Canadian Military Headquarters in London as a junior intelligence officer.

In London, Colonel Charles Perry Stacey became aware of Hughes's training as a historian and in the summer of 1943 recruited him for his Canadian Army Historical Section, which had the task of ensuring that good records were kept for the benefit of future official historians of the war. Stacey's aim was to send Hughes as a field historical officer, travelling with the 1st Canadian Division and the 1st Canadian Armoured Tank Brigade in the Allied invasion of Sicily. This was at first resisted by George Kitching, who suspected a spy was being planted on him and found another officer for the role, but the 1st Canadian Division commanding officer, Guy Simonds, liked the idea of more historical officers, and in November 1943 with Simonds's support Stacey sent Hughes to Italy. He went out by ship, travelling with the war artist Charles Comfort, who later said he had found Hughes "a spirited companion, with a refreshing sense of humour and a staggering knowledge of history."

On arrival the two men went north to the front, where Canadian forces, were fighting, as part of a unit called the 1st Canadian Field Historical Section. Hughes was at home with the Canadian officers, and as he collected information for historical purposes, seeking to understand the campaign, senior officers began to find they could rely on him for good tactical information.

After a few weeks, W. E. C. Harrison, professor of history at Queen's University and Hughes's immediate superior in the 1st CFHS, arrived to visit him, in cold weather, under heavy fire from German artillery. He reported back "Sam Hughes remained outwardly unperturbed by the discomforts of the situation," he wrote, "although I have never seen anyone disappear more quickly than on the three occasions when Jerry's planes came over. I admit that I studied Sam's technique with interest and before I left I could disappear as quickly as he did." Harrison later wrote that "the main problem of the historical officer was to correlate three sets of lies, those of the unit, those of brigade, and those of division."

After a year on active service, at the end of 1944, Stacey brought Hughes back to England to work with him to begin to collate the records the field historians had collected. Hughes later wrote in his autobiography, Steering the Course, that this was in accordance with a plan of Stacey's and would prevent him from leaving England again for the duration of the war and some time after it. By this time, Hughes's wife, Helen, was also in London, working at British Columbia House on Regent Street, and they moved into a small flat in Nell Gwynn House on Sloane Avenue.

In 1945, Stacey and Hughes produced an illustrated volume on the Italian campaign called From Pachino to Ortona in December 1943. After the end of the war in Europe, in May 1945, Hughes wrote a booklet entitled After Victory - What? Hughes remained on Stacey's team, sorting documents and acting as research assistant for Stacey, who was appointed as an official historian of the war. They arranged for the interrogation of enemy officers on the losing side of the Italian campaign, and Hughes also acted as support officer for Farley Mowat, who was travelling around Europe seeking material for the Canadian War Museum.

In April 1946, although Stacey had hoped to keep him longer, Hughes returned to Osgoode Hall to complete his training for the law, retiring from the Canadian Army as a Lieutenant-Colonel.

== Legal career ==
Hughes took his degree from Osgoode Hall in 1948 and from there was called to the bar. He unsuccessfully contested the 1949 Canadian federal election as a Progressive Conservative candidate in Welland. He had a distinguished legal career, and in 1955 was appointed as a Queen's Counsel, then became the first chairman of the Ontario Highway Transport Board, and in 1960 a Judge of the Supreme Court of Ontario. By 1960 he was a temporary Chairman of the Civil Service Commission of Canada. From 1966 to 1969 he chaired a Royal Commission inquiring into the failure of Atlantic Acceptance Corporation Ltd, ending with the publication of a four-volume report. He continued as a justice of the Supreme Court of Ontario, from which he retired in September 1988, at the age of seventy-five. However, six months later a scandal in Newfoundland brought him out of retirement.

== Hughes Commission ==
On 31 March 1989, soon after The Sunday Express had alleged a cover-up of child abuse at the Mount Cashel Orphanage in Newfoundland by the Government of Newfoundland and Labrador, the Royal Newfoundland Constabulary, and the Roman Catholic Archdiocese of St. John's, the acting premier, Tom Rideout, announced the appointment of a Royal Commission to be chaired by Hughes to investigate the allegations of obstruction of justice, particularly with regard to two police reports dated 18 December 1975 and 3 March 1976. On 18 April 1989, Hughes flew to St John's, Newfoundland, to begin his task. The Hughes Inquiry began on 1 June 1989 and heard from witnesses over two years, publishing its report in April 1992. It found that some employees of the Christian Brothers of Ireland in Canada who had been investigated by the police in 1975 should have been charged, and that the Department of Justice had interfered with the investigation. Hughes recommended that Newfoundland and Labrador should establish a fund to compensate the victims of abuse. The orphanage closed in 1990, and on 5 April 5, 1992, after the publication of Hughes's report, the Brothers formally apologised to the victims.

Hughes died in 2002.

== Select publications ==
- S. H. S. Hughes, "Sir Sam Hughes and the Problem of Imperialism" in Historical Papers (1950), pp. 30–40
- S. H. S. Hughes, Q.C., "The Law and Folklore in Transport Board Appearances" in Canadian Motorist (Ontario Motor League, 1954)
- S. H. S. Hughes, "The Formulation and Execution of Personnel Policy" in Public Personnel Review, Volumes 23-24 (1962)
- S. H. S. Hughes, "A Comparison of the Old and New Civil Service Acts", in Paul Fox, ed., Toronto: Canada (Toronto: McGraw Hill, 1962)
- The Hon. S. H. S. Hughes, Commissioner, Report of the Royal Commission appointed to inquire into the failure of Atlantic Acceptance Corporation Ltd (Toronto: Queen's Printer, 1969): four volumes
- Sam Hughes, Steering the Course: a Memoir (McGill-Queen's Press, 2000)
