= Sexual abuse cases in the Congregation of Christian Brothers =

The sexual abuse scandal in the Congregation of Christian Brothers is a major chapter in the series of Catholic sex abuse cases in various Western jurisdictions.

== Abuse by country ==
=== Australia ===
In Australia, there were allegations that during the 1970s sexual abuses took place at the junior campus of St Patrick's College and St Alipius Primary School in Ballarat, Victoria. After investigation, Brothers Robert Best, Edward Dowlan and Stephen Francis Farrell were all convicted of sex crimes. Dowlan and Best were later transferred to the senior campus, and continued to offend. "Four of the school's brothers and their chaplain, Gerald Ridsdale, were accused of sexually assaulting children — all but one, who died before charges could be laid, have been convicted."

Robert Best taught at Catholic primary and secondary schools in Ballarat, Box Hill, and Geelong (all in Victoria, Australia) between the 1960s and 1980s. He was convicted by a jury after pleading guilty to more than 40 child sex offences against dozens of students, some as young as eight years old. Robert Best was sentenced to fourteen years and nine months jail on August 8, 2011.

The Commissioners found that in one instance a complaint was made to a Brother Nangle about Brother Dowlan's putting his hands down students' pants; a student was required to apologize to the school assembly for "spreading lies". (Dowlan was later jailed for multiple instances of sexual abuse.) Dowlan (Ted Bales) pleaded guilty to 33 counts of indecently assaulting boys under the age of 16 and one count of gross indecency between 1971 and 1986. The judge found that he had preyed on vulnerable boys as young as eight years old over a 14-year period at six different schools from the first year he became a Christian Brother in 1971. Dowlan has been jailed twice, first in 1996 for six-and-a-half years and then again in 2015. Blair Smith had been one of the first detectives to properly investigate Christian Brother abuse in Victoria, his work in the early 1990s leading to the conviction of Edward Dowlan. The Royal Commission also found that the Christian Brothers spent almost $1.5 million defending Best, Dowlan, and Farrell.

The Royal Commission into Institutional Responses to Child Sexual Abuse found that Gerald Leo Fitzgerald, a Christian Brother, was moved to new locations with continued access to children after abuse allegations had been made. One victim described the type of behavior of Fitzgerald to the Commission: "Brother Fitzgerald was his grade 3 teacher in 1974. He said that at the end of school every Friday Brother Fitzgerald would line up his students and kiss them goodbye. He kissed some with his tongue." He died in 1987 before any charges were laid against him.

Minutes of the meeting of the Christian Brothers Provincials with their lawyers on December 7, 1993, showed that the meeting was not focused on settling the proceedings: the concern was the cost, and there was no sentiment of recognizing the suffering of the survivors. In May 2013, the Christian Brothers admitted to Victoria's parliamentary inquiry into child abuse that they did what they could to defend order members accused of sexual assault against children.

During the 2016 Royal Commission into Institutional Responses to Child Sexual Abuse in Ballarat it was found that 853 children were sexually abused by one or more Christian Brothers with the average age of 13. 281 Christian Brothers have had abuse complaints substantiated, and the Christian Brothers have paid $37.3 million in compensation. During the Ballarat Case Study of the Royal Commission it was found that Glynis McNeight, a private investigator, was paid by the Christian Brothers (through a retained law firm) to investigate two individuals who had alleged having been sexually abused by Brother Edward Dowlan. McNeight's report was tabled that contained a strategy to manipulate witnesses such as a victim could "easily be torn down in the witness box" and "the person himself is a very nervous, excitable type who will reduce to tears and bad language easily". It was also shown that the Christian Brothers knew of abuse at the hands of Brothers but did not tell police and spent almost $1.5 million defending pedophile Brothers Robert Best, Edward Dowlan and Stephen Farrell.

=== Canada ===
The Christian Brothers in Canada have had more than 300 former pupils alleged physical and sexual abuse at the Mount Cashel Orphanage in Newfoundland. When allegations of physical and sexual abuse started to surface in the late 1980s, the government, police and local church leaders conspired in an unsuccessful cover-up. In Ontario in January 1993 the Christian Brothers reached a financial settlement totaling $23 million with 700 former students who alleged abuse.

Allegations of sexual abuse at Mount Cashel Boys Home orphanage in Newfoundland (Canada) led to a royal commission (The Hughes Inquiry) and further investigations followed into allegations at other institutions across Canada. Throughout 1989-1993, nine Christian Brothers were charged and prosecuted for various criminal offences including sex offences against the boys of Mount Cashel orphanage.

In February 2021, a British Columbia man alleged that he was sexually abused by one of the Christian Brother's, who confessed to the Royal Newfoundland Constabulary of molesting children at the Mount Cashel Orphanage in 1975.

In August 2022, a British Columbia man, known only as 'John B. Doe,' filed a class action lawsuit in British Columbia, alleging that he was physically and sexually abused while attending Vancouver College, a preparatory Catholic School for boys located in the Shaughnessy neighbourhood of Vancouver, British Columbia. The lawsuit alleges that six Christian Brothers working as teachers at the school, were known to have committed crimes, (in some cases admitted to crimes) against children in NL, before being transferred to Vancouver to teach at Vancouver College.

In September 2022, police in Burnaby, BC, acknowledged that they had an active investigation in relation to a complaint against a former NL Christian Brother, who was transferred from the Mount Cashel Orphanage subsequent to allegations of child molestation, to St. Thomas More Collegiate, a private school ran by the congregation of Christian Brothers. The complainant, John A. Doe, is accusing former Christian Brother Edward English of abuse allegations during his time at the private college. John A. Doe, questions how Brother English was allowed to quietly be transferred from NL to BC, without charges, after admitting to molesting children to the Royal Newfoundland Constabulary, in 1975.

=== India ===
Despite a culture of silence around child sexual abuse in India, abuses continue into the 21st century, though few allegations see the light of day. Mathew N. Schmalz, director of Asian Studies at the College of the Holy Cross in Worcester, has researched Catholicism in Asia and Africa, and argues that although celibate men are viewed as sexually aberrant in the United States, they are held in respect in Asia. According to him "In India you'd have gossip and rumors, but it never reaches the level of formal charges or controversies." While prosecution of a few egregious cases has happened, most cases are never revealed, investigated, punished or prosecuted, even though more lawsuits are being filed against the Congregation of Christian Brothers in India (CCBI) for the trauma caused by Brothers, whether alive or deceased. One case that emerged during the #MeToo movement was of Francis Gale who was alleged in a detailed Facebook post to have molested Mary Therese Kurkalang, a tribal woman, since she was five years old. Despite an internal investigation that began in 2018 by the "Society Protection Officer," he was not prosecuted and remained a member of the Brothers as of January 2023.

=== Ireland ===
In Ireland, during the latter part of the 20th century, corporal punishment was casual, frequent and brutal in Artane Industrial School, which was run by Christian Brothers. Artane's staff included a number of Brothers who had been warned for "embracing and fondling" boys. Accused Brothers were excused, lightly admonished or, typically, moved to other institutions.

In Ireland in March 1998, the Congregation of the Christian Brothers published half-page advertisements in newspapers apologizing to former pupils who had been ill-treated whilst in their care. The advertising campaign expressed "deep regret" on behalf of the Christian Brothers and listed telephone lines which former pupils could ring if they needed help.

Commission to Inquire into Child Abuse

In the Irish Commission to Inquire into Child Abuse's five-volume report of its investigation of systemic abuse of children in Ireland, the Congregation of Christian Brothers, which was the largest provider of residential care for boys in the country, received more allegations of abuse than all of the other male religious orders combined. Artane was the largest industrial school. The Commission to Inquire into Child Abuse found that Artane was under-staffed by a small number of largely inexperienced and untrained Brothers.

In 2003, the order took legal action against the Commission to Inquire into Child Abuse, to prevent the Commission from naming deceased brothers and brothers who were too old to competently defend themselves. The High Court rejected the challenge, but did stipulate that the Commission must take into account the corroboration of accusations and the testing of witness evidence, and to allow the representatives of deceased brothers to cross-examine witnesses. However, Justice Sean Ryan later overruled this when he took over the commission, and declared that individual perpetrators of abuse would not be named unless they had already been convicted

The congregation issued a statement saying "The Christian Brothers accept, with shame, the findings of the Commission to Inquire into Child Abuse... The congregation is deeply sorry for the hurt we have caused - not just for the mistakes of the past, but for the inadequacy of our responses over recent years."

Financial settlements

In late November 2009 the organization announced they would supply a €161 million (£145 million sterling) package as part of reparations for child abuse in Ireland. This includes a donation of €30 million to a government trust and €4 million donated to provide counselling services. Playing fields owned by the organisation and valued at €127 million would be transferred to joint ownership of the government and the trust that runs former Christian Brothers schools.

==== Report of the Scoping Inquiry into Historical Sexual Abuse in Day and Boarding Schools Run by Religious Orders ====
Mary O'Toole writes that "In total, 820 allegations of abuse are recorded in relation to those 132 schools." "303" people were accused and of those allegations "16 members and former members of the Christian Brothers have been convicted of child sexual abuse", "5 lay staff have been convicted of child sexual abuse" and "1 member of the clergy associated with their school who was not a Christian Brother has been convicted, though the order is unsure if this conviction was for offences in one of their schools."

=== United States ===
In 1998, a member of the Congregation of Christian Brothers was arrested for indecent solicitation of a minor. Robert Brouillette was convicted in March 2000 of 10 charges related to child pornography.

In 2011, the North American chapter of the Congregation of Christian Brothers filed for Chapter 11 bankruptcy due to the financial burden caused by sex abuse lawsuits. The North American Province includes brothers in the United States and Canada. The majority of the claims were regarding the now-defunct Briscoe Memorial School, an orphanage and boarding school in Kent, Washington jointly run by the Archdiocese of Seattle and the Christian Brothers.

In 2013, the North American chapter agreed to pay approximately $16.5 million in damages to more than 400 men and women who were sexually or physically abused as children by members of the order. Between 2006 and 2011, the order had already paid approximately 25.6 million to victims in 50 abuse cases.

=== United Kingdom ===
==== England ====
In December 2012, the Christian Brothers school St Ambrose College, Altrincham, Greater Manchester, was implicated in a child sex abuse case. A former lay teacher, Deacon Alan Morris, was convicted of nineteen counts of sexual assault occurring between 1972 and 1991.

In 2016, an ex-pupil of St Aidan's Christian Brothers school in Sunderland was paid £17,000 compensation after claiming two members of the Christian Brothers, Brother Norman Williams and headmaster Brother Dennis O’Brien, abused him at school in 1960s.

==== Northern Ireland ====
In Northern Ireland, Christian Brother and former school principal Paul Dunleavy was convicted of 72 counts involving 18 victims over three trials for sexual offences against boys in his care at four schools in Belfast, Newry and Armagh between 1964 and 1991. At his third sentencing, in 2024 aged 89, a police spokesman said "There is only one place for Dunleavy and that is behind bars. He will die in prison." The Christian Brothers declined to comment.

==== Scotland ====
In 2016, two former Christian Brothers were sent to prison for both sexual and physical abuse. John Farrell, the former Headmaster of St Ninian's Falkland, was sentenced to five years, and Paul Kelly ten years.

In 2021 The Scottish Child Abuse Inquiry issued a report on the St. Ninians residential school which had been run by the Christian Brothers between 1953 and 1983. The report concluded that the school was a "a place of abuse and deprivation" particularly from 1969 until the school closed in 1983. The Christian Brothers were able to "pursue their abusive practices with impunity" and the evidence against them was "shocking and distressing." Children in care suffered sexual, physical and emotional abuse. Michael Madigan, a representative for the Christian Brothers, said the congregation acknowledged with 'deepest regret' that children had been abused.

A victim was awarded £1.4m in damages in 2022, believed to be the highest sum ever to be awarded to a survivor.

== See also ==
- Charter for the Protection of Children and Young People
- Child sexual abuse
- National Review Board
- Pontifical Commission for the Protection of Minors
- Religious abuse
- Roman Catholic sex abuse cases
- Sexual abuse
- Sexual misconduct
- Spiritual abuse
