= Doe v Bennett =

- Supreme Court of Canada

Hearing: January 14, 2004 Judgment: March 25, 2004
- Citations: 2004 SCC 17, [2004] 1 S.C.R. 436
- Docket No.: 29426
- Ruling: The Roman Catholic Episcopal Corporation of St. George's (a corporation sole occupied by the bishop) is directly and vicariously liable for sexual abuse by Bennett, a priest in its diocese. The court declines to address the question of whether the Roman Catholic Church can be held liable.

Court membership
- Chief Justice: Beverley McLachlin; Puisne Justices: Frank Iacobucci, John C. Major, Michel Bastarache, Ian Binnie, Louise Arbour, Louis LeBel, Marie Deschamps, Morris Fish

Reasons given
- Unanimous reasons by: Beverley McLachlin C.F.

Laws applied
- Bazley v Curry, [1999] 2 SCR 534; Jacobi v Griffiths, [1999] 2 SCR 570; KLB v British Columbia, 2003 SCC 51, [2003] 2 SCR 403

Doe v Bennett, 2004 SCC 17 is a legal ruling by the Supreme Court of Canada which upheld the lower court's decision that the ecclesiastical corporation, Roman Catholic Episcopal Corporation of St. George's in Western Newfoundland, was vicariously liable (as well as directly liable) for sexual abuse by Father Kevin Bennett.

The Court concluded that the ecclesiastical corporation's secondary responsibility originates from the power and authority over parishioners that the Church gave to its priests. The facts satisfied the close connection test: "the evidence overwhelmingly satisfies the tests affirmed in Bazley, Jacobi and KLB The relationship between the diocesan enterprise and Bennett was sufficiently close." It asserted that:

The relationship between the bishop and a priest in a diocese is not only spiritual, but temporal. The priest takes a vow of obedience to the bishop. The bishop exercises extensive control over the priest, including the power of assignment, the power to remove the priest from his post and the power to discipline him. It is akin to an employment relationship. ... The relationship between the bishop and the priest is sufficiently close. Applying the relevant test to the facts, it is also clear that the necessary connection between the employer-created or enhanced risk and the wrong complained of is established. ... First, the bishop provided Bennett with the opportunity to abuse his power. ... Second, Bennett’s wrongful acts were strongly related to the psychological intimacy inherent in his role as priest. ... Third, the bishop conferred an enormous degree of power on Bennett relative to his victims.

The Court declined to address the "difficult question of whether the Roman Catholic Church can be held liable in a case such as this."
