= Hughes Inquiry =

Canadian royal commission

The Royal Commission of Inquiry into the Response of the Newfoundland Criminal Justice System to Complaints also known as the Hughes Inquiry was a Canadian royal commission chaired by a retired judge, Samuel Hughes, launched after allegations of sexual abuse by members of the Congregation of Christian Brothers at Mount Cashel Orphanage in Newfoundland. The commission began inquiry investigations on 1 June 1989 and published its report in April 1992.

== Description ==
Further investigations followed into allegations at other institutions across Canada. The inquiry concluded that officials had transferred offenders and covered up the sexual abuse at Mount Cashel. It recommended that victims be compensated.

There was insufficient evidence to charge church and government officials with obstructing justice. Eleven Christian Brothers were eventually convicted and sentenced to between 4 months and 11 years in prison.

The orphanage was closed in 1990, and on April 5, 1992, the Brothers formally apologised to the victims of abuse at Mount Cashel.

The fight to compensate the victims of Mount Cashel lasted for many years and in 1996 the Newfoundland government paid $11.5 million in compensation. The courts ordered the assets of the Brothers sold to compensate the victims, who were to receive between $20,000 and $600,000 each in compensation.

== See also ==
- Mount Cashel Orphanage
- Sexual abuse scandal in St. John's archdiocese
- The Boys of St. Vincent, a movie based on the scandal
