= Mount Cashel Orphanage =

Boys' home in St. John's, Newfoundland and Labrador, Canada

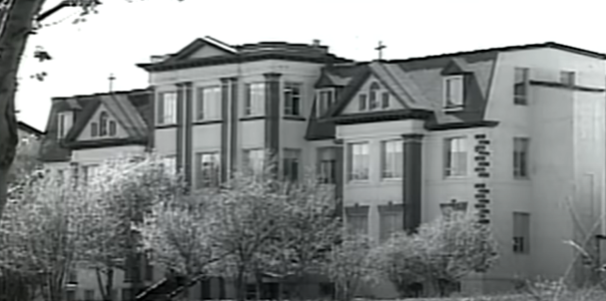
Mount Cashel Orphanage, St. John's NL, Circa 1975

The Mount Cashel Orphanage, known locally as the Mount Cashel Boys' Home, was a boys' orphanage located in St. John's, Newfoundland and Labrador, Canada. The orphanage was operated by the Congregation of Christian Brothers, and became infamous for a sexual abuse scandal and cover-up by the Royal Newfoundland Constabulary and NL justice officials.

== History ==
In 1898, the Roman Catholic Archbishop of St. John's Michael Francis Howley donated land for an orphanage on the northeastern edge of the Dominion's capital, approximately 1 km (0.62 mi) north of Quidi Vidi Lake. The orphanage was named the Mount Cashel Boys Home after the Rock of Cashel in County Tipperary, where it is said that Saint Patrick baptized the pagan king Óengus mac Nad Froích in 450 AD. The facility was located on the eastern side of the intersection of Mount Cashel Road and Torbay Road. The Mount Cashel Orphanage, as with numerous other orphanages in Newfoundland, received a bequest from the estate of James M. Ryan in 1917.

Following Confederation in 1949, the provincial government began to place wards of the state at the Mount Cashel Orphanage in the 1950s.

For the last 40 years of operation, the facility was operated by the Christian Brothers of Ireland in Canada (CBIC). The CBIC announced on November 27, 1989, that the orphanage would be closing.

Canada's largest sexual abuse scandal was disclosed in 1989, resulting in the closure of the facility in 1990 after the last resident was moved to an alternate facility. The property was seized and the site razed and sold for real-estate development in the mid-1990s as part of a court settlement ordering financial compensation to the victims.

Today a Sobeys supermarket at 10 Elizabeth Avenue and a small residential development called Howley Estates sit on the land once occupied by the orphanage.

== Timeline of events ==
- In October 1974, two boys, Johnny Williams and Derek O'Brien, both residents of the orphanage, are taken to NL's Department of social services by a female relative of Williams. The boys complain to the department that a Christian Brother had beaten Williams. The boys further allege that some of the Christian Brothers working at Mount Cashel are sexually and physically abusing resident boys at the facility.
- In September 1975, two boys, ten-year-old Billy Earle and his friend ten-year-old Bobby Connors, are taken to NL's Department of Social Services after being beaten by a Christian Brother. The two boys tell social workers that physical and sexual abuse is common at the orphanage.
- In October 1975, the two social workers inform the head of the department of the allegations of sexual and physical abuse reported to them by Earle and Conners.
- On December 7, 1975, a volunteer working at the orphanage suspects that Billy Earle's younger brother Shane was beaten by a Christian Brother. The RCMP is contacted, and the younger Earle boy, who is still sporting fresh bruises from the recent beating is interviewed. The boy reports instances of sexual and physical abuse at the orphanage.
- On December 8, 1975, the volunteer reports the beating to NL's Department of Social Services, who take the beaten boy to hospital. A doctor reports the abuse to the Royal Newfoundland Constabulary (RNC).
- On December 9, 1975, the RNC open an investigation into abuse at the orphanage. During the following weeks, police interview 24 boys living at the facility, and learn that almost all the boys report being sexually abused and beaten by Christian Brothers.
- On December 17, 1975, police interview two of the Orphanage's Christian Brothers, who confess to child molestation.
- On December 18, 1975, the Chief of Police for the Royal Newfoundland Constabulary orders the investigation into sexual abuse at the orphanage closed. The police officer who had conducted the interviews with the 24 children and two Christian Brothers is told to destroy his report, and write another report without using any references to sex abuse. The police officer complies with the Chief's demand, and writes a report implicating the Christian Brothers in physical abuse only.
- In late December 1975, the two Christian Brothers who confessed to sexually abusing children under their care are transferred to the United States "for treatment."
- In January 1976, NL's primary newspaper, "The Evening Telegram," learns of the allegations of sexual abuse at the orphanage. Two NL journalists investigate the allegations, and prepare to break the news. However, the then publisher kills the story and prevents it from going to press.
- On March 3, 1976, NL's Justice Department, orders the Chief of the Royal Newfoundland Constabulary, to tell the police officer who was in charge of the sexual abuse investigation to produce another report on his investigation, and to omit any references of sex.
- On January 26, 1977, after reviewing the two police reports of abuse in relation to the Mount Cashel Orphanage, NL's Deputy Minister of Justice tells the Chief of Police that further police action is unwarranted, and the sexual abuse investigation into Mount Cashel Orphanage is officially closed.
- On April 10, 1979, a Royal Newfoundland Constabulary police officer is testifying at an inquiry unrelated to Mount Cashel Orphanage. The police officer states that the RNC police have previously been involved in various police cover-ups, and cites the Mount Cashel Orphanage sexual abuse allegations as an example.
- In 1982, NL's Department of Social Services inform the RNC of another report of sexual abuse from Mount Cashel Orphanage. The police investigate, and a Christian Brother is charged and prosecuted for molestation. The Brother is sentenced to four months in prison, followed by three years probation, but his sentence is reduced by a NL judge to 12 days time served, and his probation period is wiped clean.
- On February 3, 1989, a concerned citizen calls into a NL open-line radio program and demands a public inquiry into the 1975 RNC investigation into the sexual abuse allegations at Mount Cashel Orphanage. The caller alleges to the Newfoundland and Labrador public, who are listening to the radio program, that police and government officials had covered up sex abuse at the orphanage.
- On February 15, 1989, Lynn Verge NL's then Minister of Justice announces that the Royal Newfoundland Constabulary has re-opened its 1975 investigation into sexual abuse allegations at the orphanage, fourteen years after police had first learned of the abuse.
- On March 19, 1989, then twenty-one-year-old Shane Earle, the boy who had previously been beaten and sexually abused at the orphanage, and who had reported that abuse to NL authorities, goes public by telling the story of the abuse he suffered at the hands of Christian Brothers at Mount Cashel Orphanage to Michael Harris, a well-known Canadian investigative journalist, who publishes Earle's story in the Sunday Express Newspaper.
- On April 14, 1989, the NL government announces a public inquiry into the handling of the 1975 investigation by police, social services and its justice department.
- In November 1989, The Christian Brothers of NL announce that the Mount Cashel Orphanage would be closing, and the approximate remaining 70 residents would be placed in community foster care.
- From 1989 to 1993, nine Christian Brothers are charged and prosecuted for various criminal offences including sex offences against the boys of Mount Cashel orphanage.

== Sexual and physical abuse scandal ==
A pattern of physical and sexual abuse of more than 300 orphanage residents perpetrated by staff members, specifically members of the Christian Brothers of Ireland in Canada (CBIC), was uncovered during the late 1980s and early 1990s.

Multiple criminal investigations, a provincial Royal Commission of Inquiry (the Hughes Inquiry) and an Archdiocese of St. John's inquiry (the Winter Commission) resulted in criminal convictions and millions of dollars in court-imposed financial settlements. Compensation was provided by the Government of Newfoundland for orphanage residents who were wards of the state and several properties owned by the CBIC in Newfoundland and Labrador and other provinces were seized and liquidated.

As of May 2009, there were still approximately 50 civil lawsuits being processed by the courts by victims of the sexual and physical abuse at the orphanage.

=== Early complaints ===
In December 1975, the Royal Newfoundland Constabulary (RNC) began an investigation into physical and sexual abuse allegations at the Mount Cashel Orphanage. This resulted in five staff who were members of the Christian Brothers of Ireland in Canada being implicated by twenty residents. The investigation was curtailed by the Chief of the RNC on instruction from the Department of Justice, despite two members of the CBIC admitting sexual wrongdoing. No further residents were interviewed and the two staff members were placed in treatment centres outside the province and then transferred to other CBIC-operated institutions in Canada.

In 1982 the RNC began a second investigation into physical and sexual abuse allegations at the Mount Cashel Orphanage. Thirteen separate reports were written (nine by the Department of Social Services and four by the RNC). One staff member who was a member of the Christian Brothers of Ireland in Canada was charged with sexual offences and convicted, receiving a sentence of four months in jail and three years probation.

=== 1989 media revelations ===
A caller to VOCM's radio call-in program Open Line on February 13, 1989, mentioned suspicion of a cover-up by the Government of Newfoundland and Labrador into sexual and physical abuse at the orphanage. One of those listening to Open Line that day was a justice of the Supreme Court of Newfoundland and Labrador who followed up on the issue with the provincial government's Associate Deputy Attorney-General. On February 14, 1989, the Crown prosecutor's file on the physical and sexual abuse allegations at the Mount Cashel Orphanage was officially re-opened and the RNC was instructed to complete its 1975 investigation and determine why charges were never laid.

On February 19, 1989 the independent weekly newspaper The Sunday Express, under the direction of publisher Michael Harris, began to publish allegations of sexual and physical abuse perpetrated by staff at the Mount Cashel Orphanage against residents, dating back to the 1950s. These editions of The Sunday Express created a sensation across Newfoundland and Labrador and quickly led to calls for a public inquiry; within weeks of Michael Harris's interviews with Shane Earle, the government appointed Justice Samuel Hughes to hold a public inquiry that was broadcast live on television.

=== 1989–1996 criminal investigation ===
The RNC investigation that was reactivated in February 1989 eventually resulted in the arrest of 14 staff members (nine members of the Christian Brothers of Ireland in Canada, five lay people) on 88 counts of physical and sexual abuse. Charges were laid against four members of the CBIC in 1992 relating to the aborted 1975 investigation, followed by further charges in 1996 alleging sexual and physical abuse committed by six staff during the 1950s and 1960s. A further four staff members were eventually charged, although only nine members of the CBIC were convicted.

=== 1989 Royal Commission ===
The growing controversy during Easter Week in late March 1989 as a result of The Sunday Express publication regarding the alleged cover-up by the Government of Newfoundland and Labrador, the RNC, and the Archdiocese of St. John's led interim Premier Tom Rideout to announce the appointment on March 31, 1989, of a Royal Commission led by a retired justice of the Supreme Court of Ontario, Samuel Hughes QC, to investigate the obstruction of justice.

In June 1989, the Hughes inquiry began hearings in St. John's NL, and heard from dozens of witnesses over two years, making its report public in April 1992. It found that the Christian Brothers, who operated the Mount Cashel Orphanage, should have been charged with crimes in relation to the reports of abuse from resident boys of the home in 1975. The commission also found that the Department of Justice had interfered with the police investigation. Commissioner Hughes recommended that the Government of Newfoundland and Labrador establish a compensation fund for the abuse victims, although no size limit was discussed nor were recommendations provided on counselling services to the victims.

In addition to the sexual and physical abuses highlighted by the inquiry, it was also learned that Royal Newfoundland Constabulary Sergeant, Arthur Pike, had received a demotion and a decrease in pay for leaking information in 1979 concerning the police cover-up of Mount Cashel.

=== 1989 Archdiocesan Commission of Enquiry ===
The Winter Commission was appointed in 1989 by Archbishop Alphonsus Penney and released its report during the following year. Its final report, submitted in 1990, was entitled The report of the Archdiocesan Commission of Enquiry into the Sexual Abuse of Children by Members of the Clergy.

Archbishop Penney resigned following the release of the commission's report, which placed some of the blame for cover-ups of the abuse on him.

== Aftermath ==
- In April 1989, Shane Earle filed a civil lawsuit against the NL government and the Roman Catholic Archdiocese of St. John's. Later, in 1990, he appeared on The Oprah Winfrey Show, where he detailed his story of abuse at the orphanage to an American audience.
- In 1990, Michael Harris released Unholy Orders: Tragedy at Mount Cashel, a non-fiction book in relation to the Mount Cashel sexual abuse scandal.
- In 1991, Derek O'Brien released Suffer Little Children: An Autobiography of a Foster Child, which detailed the abuse he suffered as a child growing up as a ward of the state, in Newfoundland and Labrador's Department of Social Services.
- In 1992, The Boys of St. Vincent, a made for television docudrama, based on events inspired by the Mount Cashel Orphanage, was released on Canadian television.
- On April 5, 1992, the Christian Brothers formally apologized to the victims of sexual and physical abuse at the Mount Cashel Orphanage.
- In July 1992, the Mount Cashel Orphanage was demolished.
- In 2022, an episode of the CBC television series Son of a Critch discussed the real-time impact that the initial revelations of the orphanage had on Newfoundland society in the 1980s.

== Settlements and ongoing litigation ==
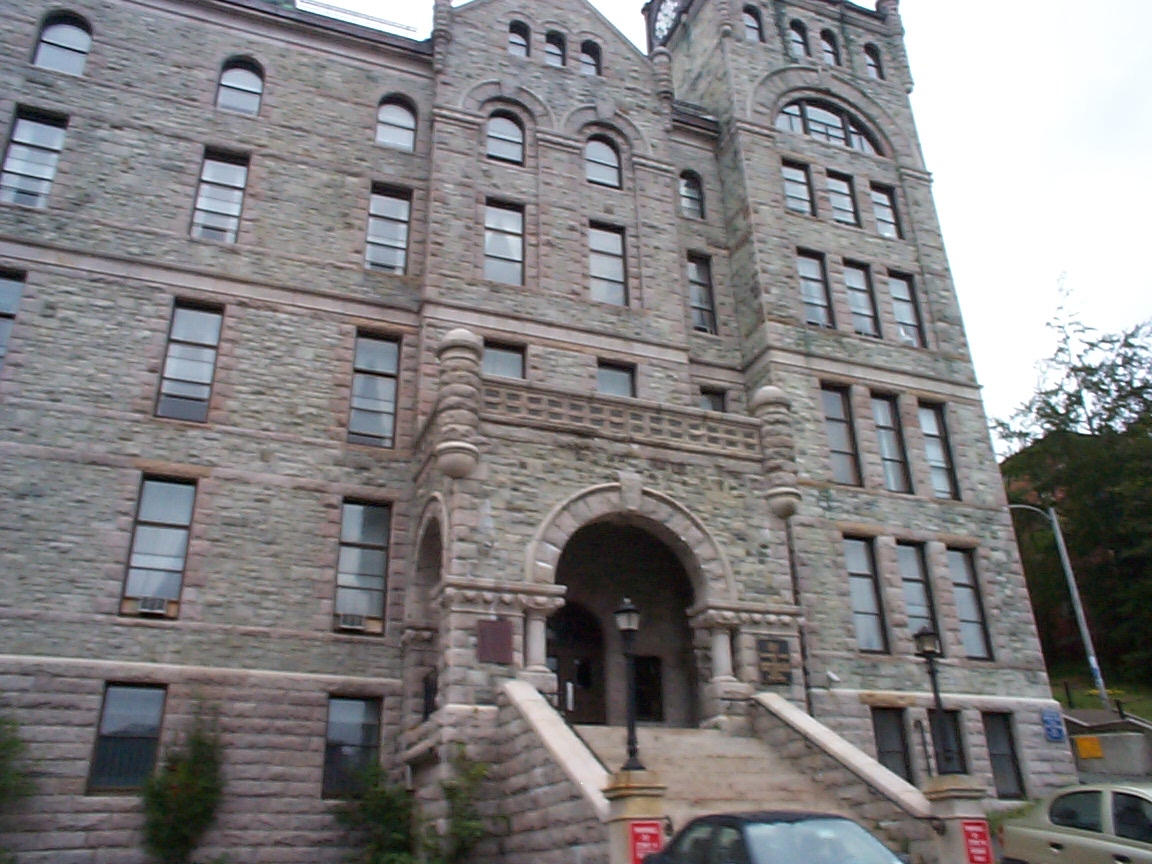
The Supreme Court of NL is shown from Water Street, St. John's, NL

In 1997, in response to the Hughes Inquiry, and facing dozens of civil lawsuits, the NL provincial government acknowledged its responsibility as a result of having sent children to the Mount Cashel Orphanage, and paid a settlement of $11.25 million to approximately 40 former residents of Mount Cashel, who were victims of sexual and physical abuse. The provincial government then began a process of seeking to reclaim the award from the assets of the Christian Brothers.

After demolition of the Mount Cashel Orphanage, the Christian Brothers sold the land to property developers for 8 million dollars, which was paid to Mount Cashel victims, after a court-ordered settlement agreement.

In December 2000 The StarPhoenix reported that leaders of the Christian Brothers at the Vatican conspired to transfer ownership of the order's assets out of Canada to prevent court-ordered liquidation to pay compensation to sexual and physical abuse victims.

From 1996 to 2004 approximately $27 million in compensation was paid to roughly 100 victims of physical and sexual abuse at the Mount Cashel Orphanage by the Government of Newfoundland and Labrador and the Christian Brothers of Ireland in Canada.

In 2011, the Christian Brothers declared bankruptcy, leaving approximately 422 outstanding sex abuse claims against the organization.

In 2018, the NL provincial government admitted liability for a social worker, who took a child from Mount Cashel Orphanage to his home to sexually assault him. The NL government paid $750,000 to settle a claim brought forward by the victim. The NL government acknowledged that it was still facing approximately 75 civil suits in relation to the Mount Cashel sexual abuse scandal.

In July 2020, the Newfoundland and Labrador court of appeal unanimously reversed a 2018 decision of the Supreme Court of Newfoundland and Labrador and ruled that the Roman Catholic Archdiocese of St. John's was vicariously liable for the sexual abuse committed at the Mount Cashel Orphanage in the 1950s and 1960s, paving the way for victims of the Mount Cashel sex abuse scandal to receive compensation from the Diocese.

In February 2021, a British Columbia man alleged that he was sexually abused by one of the Christian Brothers, who confessed to the Royal Newfoundland Constabulary of molesting children at the Mount Cashel Orphanage in 1975.

In July 2021, the Roman Catholic Archdiocese of NL announced plans to sell off assets in order to compensate victims of the Mount Cashel sex abuse scandal.

On July 5, 2024, a third-party insolvency monitor put forward a sum of $104 million to pay the victims of sexual abuse by the Archdiocese. A document filed with Newfoundland and Labrador Supreme Court put the net claim award at $104,074,667. Among the 367 claims filed, 292 had already been accepted, while 65 were disallowed and 10 were considered pending. The document stated the average payment to a claimant was $356,417.

== 2009 Nova Scotia link to Mount Cashel saga ==
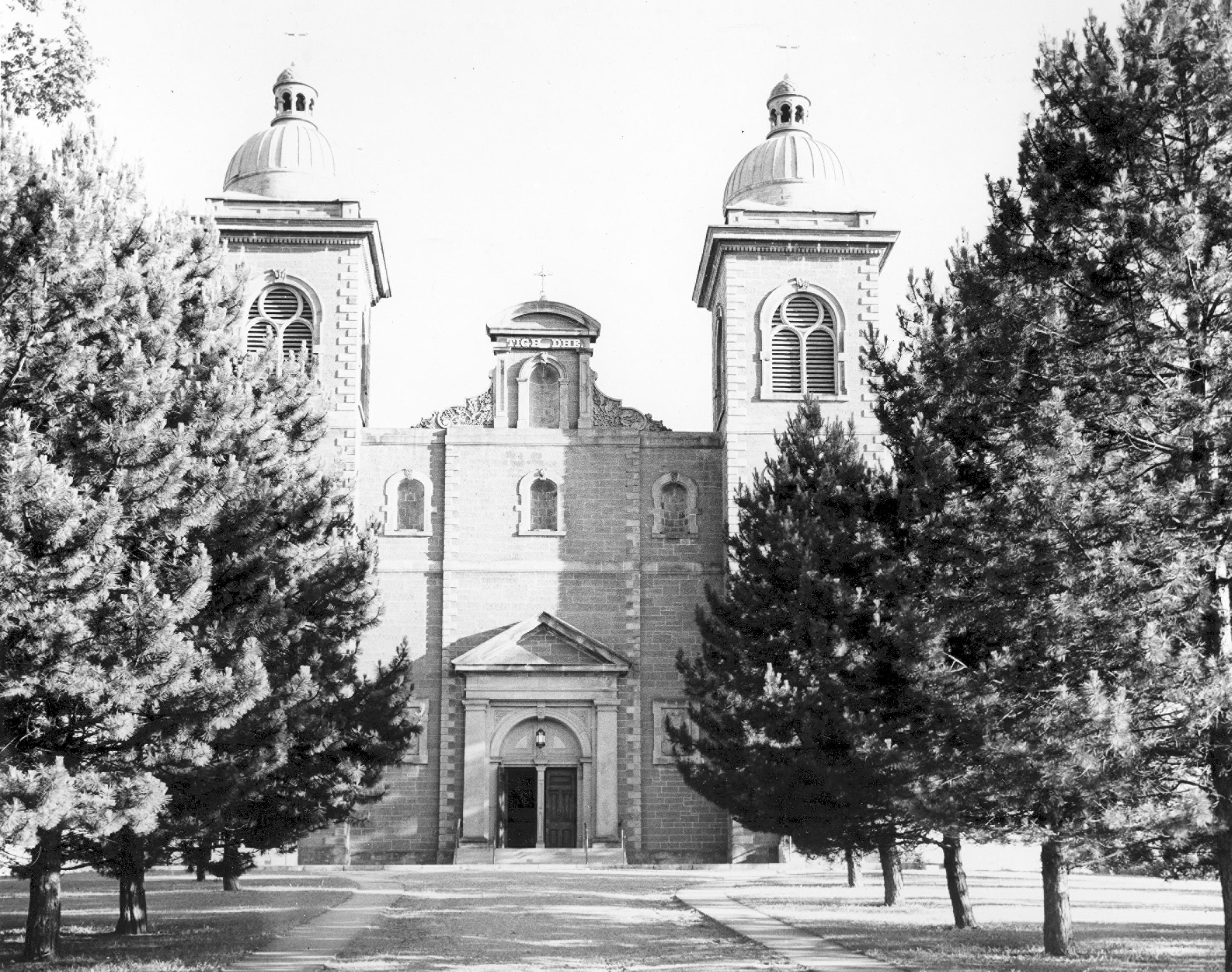
St. Ninian's Cathedral, Antigonish, NS

On September 25, 2009, the former Roman Catholic Bishop of Antigonish, Nova Scotia, was charged with importing child pornography into Canada. Raymond Lahey, a NL born priest, was entering Canada via the Ottawa International Airport, when his laptop was seized by Canadian Border Services during a routine inspection. The arrest sparked anger in NL, and two former residents of the Mount Cashel Orphanage came forward claiming that the Royal Newfoundland Constabulary had been informed that Lahey was in possession of child pornography twenty years previously in NL. Shane Earle, the young boy who was beaten and reported being sexually abused at Mount Cashel Orphanage, told the Canadian Broadcasting Corporation (CBC) he had testified about it during the Hughes inquiry. Earle was subsequently contacted by the RNC, who informed him that they were investigating the claim that Lahey had previously been in possession of child pornography in NL. The provincial police force stated they were reviewing audio and video records of interviews with victims and offenders from their investigation of sex abuse at the Mount Cashel orphanage, but were unable to find any evidence to support the allegations that Lahey had been in possession of child pornography in 1980s NL. However, several days later, on October 5, Church officials in NL, acknowledged that they themselves were made aware of child pornography allegations against Lahey in 1989.

Lahey was convicted of possessing child pornography in a Nova Scotia court in 2012.

== 2022 British Columbia Link to Mount Cashel saga ==
In August 2022, a British Columbia man, known only as 'John B. Doe,' filed a class action lawsuit in British Columbia, alleging that he was physically and sexually abused while attending Vancouver College, a preparatory Catholic School for boys located in the Shaughnessy neighbourhood of Vancouver, British Columbia. The lawsuit alleges that six Christian Brothers working as teachers at the school were known to have committed crimes (in some cases admitted to crimes) against children in NL, before being transferred to Vancouver to teach at Vancouver College.

In September 2022, police in Burnaby, BC, acknowledged that they had an active investigation in relation to a complaint against a former NL Christian Brother who was transferred from the Mount Cashel Orphanage, subsequent to allegations of child molestation, to St. Thomas More Collegiate, a private school ran by the congregation of Christian Brothers. The complainant, John A. Doe, is accusing former Christian Brother Edward English of abuse allegations during his time at the private college. John A. Doe questions how Brother English was allowed to quietly be transferred from NL to BC, without charges, after admitting to molesting children to the Royal Newfoundland Constabulary, in 1975.

In March 2023, a class action lawsuit was approved to move forward by a British Columbia court. Darren Libtrot, the lead plaintiff in the suit, claims he was physically and sexually abused by then Christian Brother Edward English, who admitted to sexual abuse against children to Newfoundland police in the 1970s. However, English along with several other Christian Brothers were moved out of the province of Newfoundland and Labrador in an elaborate cover up by the Royal Newfoundland Constabulary, and the NL Justice Department. Libtrot has since been joined by dozens of men claiming they suffered physical and sexual abuse while students at St. Thomas More Collegiate and Vancouver College.

In November 2023, Edward English was arrested by Vancouver police at his home in New Brunswick, over allegations of sex abuse stemming from his time working at Vancouver College, a private Catholic boys' school.

== 2023 Chicago, Illinois, US, and Australian links to Mount Cashel Saga ==
In 2018, the Attorney General of Illinois, launched an investigation to help better understand the scope of the Catholic abuse problem within the state of Illinois. In 2023, the investigation revealed that at least 451 Catholic clerics and religious brothers abused at least 1,997 children across the dioceses of Illinois. One of the accused, Chicago native Ronald Lasik, was sentenced to 11 years in prison for sexually and physically abusing young boys at Mount Cashel Orphanage in the 1950s. The Chicago Sun-Times had previously reported that Lasik was accused of abusing two boys between 1966 and 1968, while working at Saint Laurence High School in Chicago. Similarly, Lasik was linked to abuse in two Australian schools after an investigation by the Australian Broadcasting Corporation found he showed up in that country in the early 1970s. Multiple former students have accused Lasik of physical and sexual abuse at a pair of Australian schools.

== Victims ==
There are approximately 100 known victims of sexual and physical abuse stemming from the Mount Cashel Orphanage. Most victims of the Mount Cashel sex abuse scandal are identified as a numbered "John Doe," for example, John Doe #56, John Doe #34, etc.

In 1993, Johnny Williams, who was 15 years old when he went to police in 1975 to report abuse at the orphanage, died at the age of 39 due to medical issues. His sister said he died in much the same way he lived his life, 'in pain and alone'. Johnny's twin brother, Jerome Williams, also a former resident at Mount Cashel, died by suicide.

In 1994, the CBC released "The unforgiven: Mount Cashel, five years later," a documentary that profiled several of Mount Cashel's victims.

In 2013, William (Billy) Earle, the brother of Shane Earle and sexual abuse survivor at Mount Cashel Orphanage, was denied victim services counselling by the NL government.

In March 2014, J.J. Byrne, a victim of both physical and sexual abuse at Mount Cashel Orphanage said a letter of apology from the head of the Christian Brothers, North America, based in New Jersey, is a welcome admission, but the apology offered little in the way of reconciliation.

In 2014, a CBC reporter wrote an article about Shawn Janes, a Mount Cashel survivor, who died tragically after pleading with the NL government for help.

In 2022, 59-year-old Bob Connors, spoke with CBC news in relation to the abuse he and his two brothers, Greg and Darren, suffered at the hands of Christian Brothers at Mount Cashel Orphanage. Bob Connors was one of the boys who originally stepped forward and made a complaint of abuse to the Royal Newfoundland Constabulary in 1975. His statement to police, along with the statements of 23 other boys, was covered-up by the NL Justice Department allowing the abusers to be sent away without criminal charges, only to teach at other locations and allegedly abuse other victims. Bob's brother Greg Connors died by suicide on Nov 6, 2014, and Darren Connors died by suicide on June 6, 2016. Kevin Little, another St. John's man who was a victim of abuse at Mount Cashel Orphanage, also spoke out about his time spent at the orphanage, stating his life has been deeply affected by the abuse he suffered, including a suicide attempt of his own, drug and alcohol abuse and a career cut short by trying to navigate a life of trauma.

In October 2023, the family of Sean Munro, a Vancouver, BC man, who alleged he was victimized as a teenager at a private school in Vancouver, by a former Mount Cashel brother, blamed his death on the abuse he suffered at the hands of a Christian Brother, who claim the brother should never have been teaching at the school, due to allegations of abuse stemming from his time spent at Mount Cashel Orphanage.

On July 5, 2024, a third-party insolvency monitor put forward a sum of $104 million to pay the victims of sexual abuse by the Archdiocese. A document filed with Newfoundland and Labrador Supreme Court put the net claim award at $104,074,667. Among the 367 claims filed, 292 had already been accepted, while 65 were disallowed and 10 were considered pending. The document stated the average payment to a claimant was $356,417.

== Legacy ==
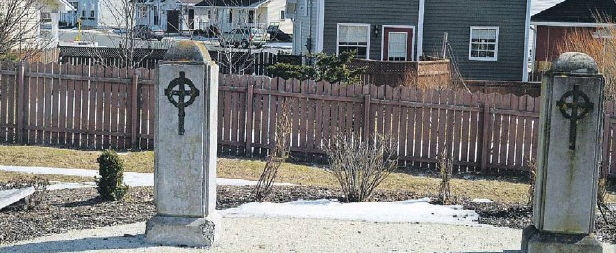
The Mount Cashel Monument located on the site of the former Mount Cashel property in St. John's, NL.

The Mount Cashel sex abuse scandal is largely credited for exposing sex abuse within the Catholic Church throughout Canada, the United States and the world.

In November 2014, Gemma Hickey, a sexual abuse survivor who suffered abuse at the hands of Clergy, founded The Pathways Foundation, a non-profit organization that helps to promote healing and prevent future abuse and misconduct within religious institutions from reoccurring.

In June 2015, Hickey began a 900 kilometre walk across the province of NL to raise awareness and support for victims of sexual abuse at religious institutions.

A small monument dedicated to the victims of the Mount Cashel sex abuse scandal sits on the property which was once home to the Mount Cashel Orphanage.
