= Canadian Association of Journalists =

Not-for-profit organization in Canada

- Association Canadienne des Journalistes
- Abbreviation: CAJ
- Formation: 1978
- Type: Not-for-profit organization
- Purpose: Advocacy and professional development for journalists
- Website: caj.ca

The Canadian Association of Journalists (CAJ; French: Association Canadienne des Journalistes) is an independent, not-for-profit organization dedicated to advocacy and professional development for journalists across Canada. Founded in 1978, the CAJ promotes excellence in journalism and encourages investigative journalism.

The organization was previously known as the Centre for Investigative Journalism (CIJ, not to be confused with the British organization of the same name founded in 2003).

The CAJ represents journalism across all media and holds a journalism awards ceremony at its annual meeting. The association published the magazine Content. It has several sub-groups for specialized members, including caucuses for legal affairs reporters, educators, and photo-journalists.

The CAJ published its first diversity study in 2021, based on voluntary survey data, which found that almost half of participating newsrooms were exclusively employing white journalists.

== See also ==
- List of Canadian journalists
