= Alphonsus Liguori Penney =

Canadian Catholic priest

- Archbishop of St. John's
- Church: Catholic Church
- Archdiocese: Archdiocese of St. John's, Newfoundland
- In office: 28 March 1979 – 2 February 1991
- Predecessor: Patrick James Skinner
- Successor: James Hector MacDonald
- Previous post: Bishop of Grand Falls (1972-1979)

Orders
- Ordination: 29 June 1949
- Consecration: 18 January 1973 by Guido del Mestri

Personal details
- Born: 17 September 1924 St. John's, Dominion of Newfoundland, British Empire
- Died: 12 December 2017 (aged 93) St. John's, Newfoundland and Labrador, Canada

Archbishop Alphonsus Liguori Penney (17 September 1924 – 12 December 2017) was a Canadian Catholic priest who was Archbishop of St. John's from 1979 to 1991. He was born in St. John's, Newfoundland.

== Sexual abuse scandal ==
The Winter Commission was appointed in 1989 by Archbishop Penney and released its report during the following year. Its final report, submitted in 1990, was entitled The report of the Archdiocesan Commission of Enquiry into the Sexual Abuse of Children by Members of the Clergy.

Archbishop Penney resigned on February 2, 1991, following the release of the commission's report, which placed some of the blame for cover-ups of the abuse on him.

Catholic Church titles
Preceded by Patrick James Skinner	Archbishop of St. John's; 1979–1991	Succeeded by James Hector MacDonald
