= Murder of Catherine Carroll =

Murder resulting in a wrongful conviction

The murder of Catherine Carroll occurred on January 1, 1991, in St. John's, Newfoundland and Labrador. In the aftermath a miscarriage of justice occurred, resulting in the wrongful conviction of Carroll's son, Gregory Parsons, in 1994. In 1998, Parsons was cleared of her murder, and Brian Doyle was found guilty of the murder in 2002.

== Background ==
On New Year's Eve 1990, Gregory Parsons, then 19 years old, was celebrating the New Year's holiday with his girlfriend Tina at her family's home. Just after midnight, Parsons telephoned his mother to wish her a Happy New Year. Several hours after the conversation, Tina's father drove Parsons home to his St. John's apartment arriving at approximately 4:00 am.

Parsons later attempted to contact Carroll by telephone, but failed several times, so at approximately 10:30 pm on January 2, 1991, Parsons left his apartment with his girlfriend, and went to his mother's home on James Place, St John's, to check on her well-being. Upon arriving at his mother's residence, Parsons attempted to open the front door, but found that it was locked. He then gained entry through a ground-level front window, and once inside, he discovered his mother's bloodied body in the upstairs bathroom. Distraught and in a state of shock over the discovery, Parsons immediately called 9-1-1.

== Police investigation ==
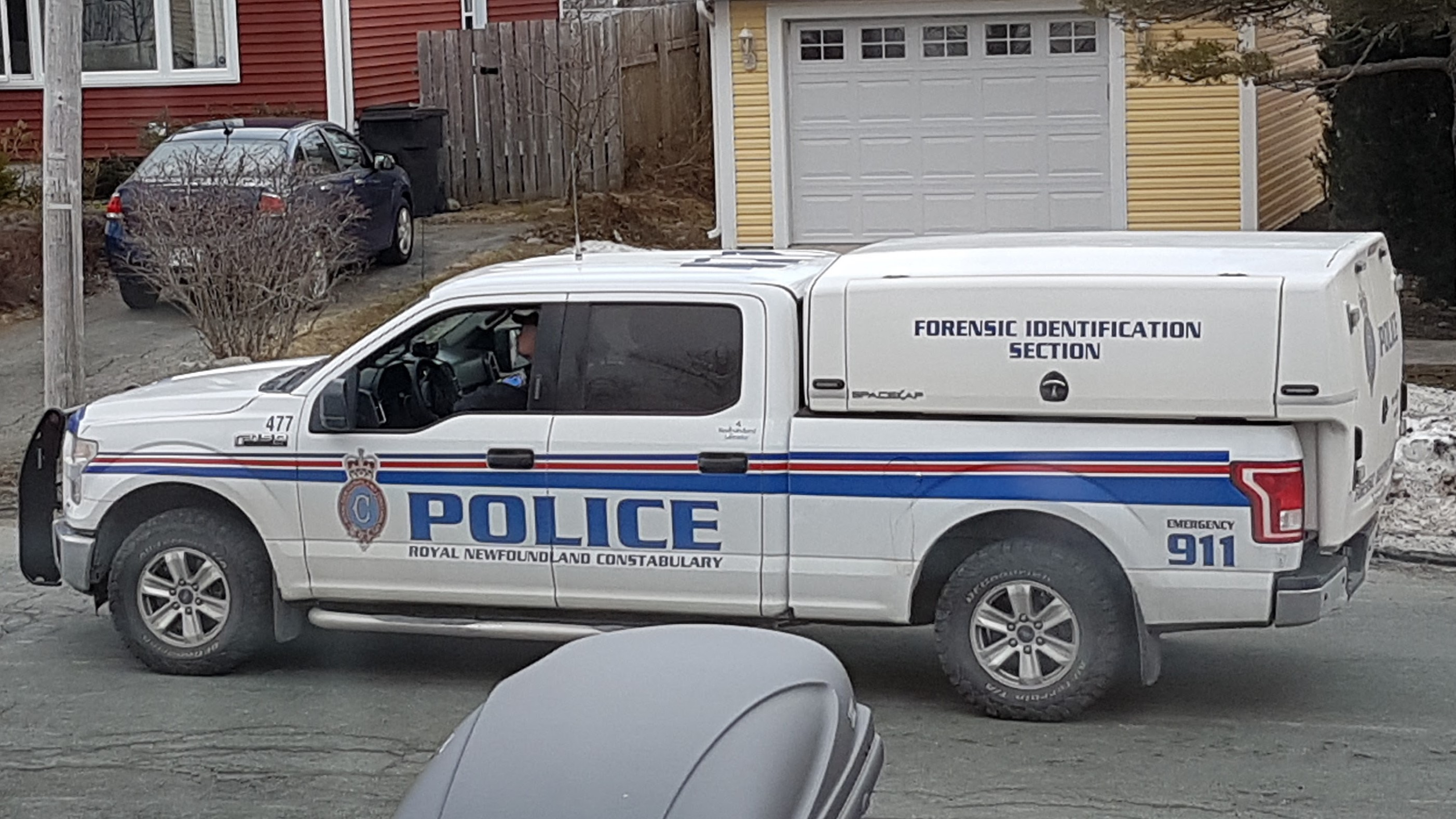
A Royal Newfoundland Constabulary forensic unit is observed on the streets of St. John's, NL

Police quickly theorized, based on their interpretation of evidence at the scene, that no forcible entry was made to the home and concluded that Catherine Carroll's killer was someone who knew her, or someone who had access to and was familiar with the home.

An autopsy report revealed that Ms. Carroll had 53 serrated blade knife wounds, and was not sexually assaulted, which led police to believe that her homicide was more likely motivated by hate or anger rather than an act of passion. Police also believed, based on the dilution of blood and water found at the scene, that Carroll's killer had showered, while she lay dead on the bathroom floor.

As police investigated the gruesome homicide, they learned that Carroll was a single mother, who had raised Parsons without spousal support, and struggled with alcoholism and her own mental health. Police also learned, that in the years preceding the homicide, Parsons and several of his friends had formed a heavy metal rock band, and often hung out in the basement of the home, practicing and listening to music, recording songs and drinking beer.

After interviewing numerous people who knew Carroll, including Parsons and his friends, who were known to have frequented the home, police began to suspect that Carroll was fearful of her son. Their theory was reinforced after interviewing Parsons's friend Brian Doyle, who described witnessing a violent fight between Parsons and his mother, and informing police of a song Parsons's band had written and performed called, "Kill Your Parents".

Without an alibi, and unable to account for Parsons's whereabouts from 4:00 am January 1, to 10:30 pm on January 2, police quickly zeroed in on Parsons as their primary suspect.

Eight days after finding his mother's mutilated body on the bathroom floor of his childhood home, the Royal Newfoundland Constabulary (RNC) charged Parsons with first-degree murder in relation to his mother's death, despite no forensic evidence linking him to the crime.

== Trial and court proceedings ==
Based on that theory, and the steadfast belief by the police that Parsons had murdered his own mother, NL prosecutors brought the matter to trial in 1994. With no physical evidence to link Parsons to the crime scene, NL prosecutors relied heavily on an audiotaped recording of Parsons's garage band's performance of the song "Kill Your Parents", which was pointed out to police in the days following the homicide by Parsons's friend, Brian Doyle.

Robert Simmonds, a St. John's based attorney who represented Parsons at trial, said in a documentary about the case that "This was never an impartial, objectively undertaken investigation based upon hard fact. They attempted to use this (song) as indicative of a state of mind, a state of hatred, a clear indication that he had it out for his mother, and that is without a doubt, very flimsy, very circumstantial and absolutely inconclusive."

Darren Bent, a well-known former NL journalist, who covered the Parsons trial for NL's NTV News, said, in relation to the song, "When the jury heard that, I don't think there was any way, that; that case could have been won by the defense, no matter what evidence they produced."

Despite the lack of evidence against Parsons, and what the Lamer Inquiry would regard as sloppy police work and an egregious case of tunnel vision, Parsons was convicted of second-degree murder and sentenced to life in prison.

== Appeal ==
Following the conviction, Parsons's defence filed an appeal on his behalf with the Supreme Court of Newfoundland and Labrador. The appeals court quickly overturned the conviction and Parsons was granted bail, after serving 68 days at Her Majesty's Penitentiary, to await a second trial. However, before a new trial could commence, advancements in DNA testing, specifically the use of PCR, a technology that was in its infancy at the time of Carroll's murder, allowed police to test previously untested blood samples. The new testing revealed that the samples retrieved at the crime scene were from an unknown male, and did not match Parsons, and he was conclusively cleared of the charge against him. On November 2, 1998, after seven years of living under a cloud of suspicion within the NL community, NL prosecutors declared Parsons's innocence.

== Second investigation ==
The discovery that a wrongful conviction had occurred led to a second police investigation into the homicide of Carroll. Using a definitive DNA sample from the crime scene, NL police began a search for a killer. Police followed previously unpursued leads, leading them to seek DNA samples from more than 150 individuals, without success. A break came when Robert Johnston, the lead investigator on the second investigation into the case, received an anonymous phone call indicating that police should look closely at Parsons's childhood friend, Brian Doyle. Doyle, who was at the time living out of province, had been an individual who police had wanted to exclude in their DNA testing. Unable to locate Doyle, police retrieved a DNA sample from a relative of Doyle's, and learned that the blood sample obtained from the Carroll homicide scene was related to Brian Doyle.

Almost ten years after the homicide of Carroll, police began to focus on Doyle, who they learned was living and working just outside Toronto, Ontario, and began a surveillance operation with the help of the Peel Regional Police, who were able to obtain Doyle's DNA from a discarded cigarette. The DNA sample from Doyle matched the unknown male DNA profile collected at the Carroll murder scene. Convinced they had Carroll's killer, Johnston launched a full-scale undercover police sting, known as Mr. Big, with the hope that Doyle would provide police with a confession.

The sting involved the use of an undercover police operative, who posed as a black market dealer selling alcohol and cigarettes out of his pick-up truck. After several days of baiting the accused, Doyle saw an opportunity to make extra money, acting as a middleman, by buying directly from the operative and selling to his co-workers. Blinded by his own greed, Doyle became more involved in the elaborate police operation, and eventually offered to kill the undercover operative's fictional wife, in an effort to prove his loyalty to his newly found crime boss. The sting proved invaluable, as Doyle eventually agreed to a meet with the head of the fictional crime family, where he ultimately provided intimate details of the Carroll murder and described the crime in gruesome detail. Unbeknownst to Doyle, Johnston and Peel Regional police inspector Mike McMullin were sitting in an adjacent room video and audio recording the entire interaction.

== Confession and retrieval of murder weapon ==
In 2001, Brian Doyle was arrested and returned to NL, where he provided police with a confession to the murder of Catherine Carroll. In addition to the confession, Doyle led police to the disposal site of the murder weapon, in which police were able to recover the knife that was used to kill Carroll ten years previous. In 2002, Brian Doyle pleaded guilty to second-degree murder, and was sentenced to life in prison without the possibility of parole for 18 years.

== Aftermath ==
In November 1998, NL's then Justice Minister, Chris Decker, announced that the province of NL had asked retired NL Justice Nathaniel Noel to conduct a review of the investigation and prosecution of Parsons. However, the NL government suspended the review after Parsons initiated a civil action against the province.

In February 2002, the government of NL paid $650,000 in compensation to Parsons, stating that the compensation was on humanitarian grounds, and not an admission of wrongdoing by the Crown.

In 2003, the government of NL appointed former Supreme Court of Canada Justice Antonio Lamer to lead an inquiry into the wrongful conviction of Parsons, and two other NL men (Randy Druken and Ronald Dalton), who had been wrongfully convicted in other murder cases. In 2004, the government of NL increased the Royal Newfoundland Constabulary's operating budget by approximately five million dollars, primarily to implement a police training program in partnership with NL's Memorial University. The desire and decision for the Province of NL to recruit and train police officers was directly related to the then ongoing Lamer inquiry, which was revealing a NL police force that was ill-equipped and improperly trained.

In April 2005, during hearings for the Lamer inquiry, the Newfoundland and Labrador Crown Attorney's office apologized to Parsons for the role they played in his prosecution. Parsons's then lawyer Jerome Kennedy said at the time that the Crown's apology did not go far enough, stating that he did not hear prosecutor's Colin Flynn, Bern Coffey, Wayne Gorman or Cathy Knox apologize for allowing hearsay evidence to be used against Parsons.

In September 2005, NL's then Justice Minister, Tom Marshall, announced that the government of NL was providing an additional $650,000 in compensation to Parsons after reviewing statements made by Justice Lamar. During the inquiry, Lamar noted that he had concerns regarding the original compensation package offered to Parsons indicating that Parsons's ten-year ordeal had left him in dire financial need, and that he most likely instructed his counsel to accept a compensation package that was less than adequate, given the level of emotional and financial hardship he endured.

In 2006, the Lamer Inquiry report into the wrongful convictions of Parsons, Randy Druken and Ronald Dalton was released. Lamer's report was highly critical of the RNC and the NL Crown Attorneys Office, characterizing the prosecution of Parsons as "excessive zeal" and describing the RNC's handling of the case as a "'runaway train,' fueled by tunnel vision and picking up many passengers along the way." The Lamer report contained 45 recommendations, many of which were directed at the RNC.

In January 2007, the Canadian Broadcasting Corporation (CBC) reported that the government of NL had spent upwards of $11 million in relation to the mishandling of the Parsons, Druken and Dalton wrongful convictions, and noted that costs would continue to mount. In 2007, the NL government announced it was launching an internal investigation into the NL Crown Attorneys Office, stemming from the Lamar inquiry. In April 2010, the Royal Newfoundland Constabulary became the first North American police department to introduce the use of the PEACE interviewing technique, in relation to the interrogation of individuals suspected of crimes. The adoption of the PEACE interviewing method was a direct result of recommendations stemming from the Lamer inquiry. In June 2010, Ab Singleton, the Royal Newfoundland Constabulary's lead investigator in the original Carroll murder investigation was promoted to the deputy chief of police of the RNC, sparking harsh criticism from Parsons.

In October 2022, Gregory Parsons's story of his wrongful conviction and the murder of his mother was featured on the CTV television program W5.

== Parsons's later life ==
Parsons married his longtime girlfriend Tina, and together the couple have two children.

Parsons became a NL firefighter with the St. John's Regional Fire Department where he currently holds the rank of lieutenant. In 2021, Parsons was named St. John's Firefighter of the year.

Parsons is a vocal advocate for the wrongfully accused, and continues to raise questions in relation to the handling of his mother's murder case and prosecution. In 2021, Parsons alluded to misconduct within the NL Crown Attorneys Office, alleging that prosecutors failed in their responsibility to properly prosecute his mother's murderer, by not opting to charge Brian Doyle with first-degree murder despite evidence that supported premeditation.

Parsons and his wife continue to seek justice for the murder of Carroll and remain highly critical of the Canadian justice system, including the Correctional Service of Canada. Parsons regularly attends, and provides victim impact statements at parole hearings in relation to Doyle, where he continues to speak out against his release.

In 2023, Parsons asked for the Premier of NL, to initiate an external review of the evidence that led to Doyle's conviction. In particular, Parsons questions why key evidence that pointed to first degree murder was not brought forward, before Doyle was provided with the opportunity to plead guilty on the lesser charge of second degree murder.

== Parole ==
In April 2020, Brian Doyle was granted day parole from the minimum security William Head Institution in British Columbia. Parsons was restricted from attending the hearing due to COVID-19 restrictions in place at the time of Doyle's release.

In April 2021, Doyle's day parole was revoked after breaching the conditions of his release. During the hearing, Parsons read a 30-page victim impact statement to the parole board, which included previously unreported evidence against Doyle. Parsons stated that the NL Crown prosecutor only selected 31 pages of transcript from the video that was obtained in the Mr. Big police sting, that Doyle's admission to the murder included acts that clearly spoke to Doyle's premeditated intent to kill Carroll, and that the transcript of the video also revealed that Doyle had a previous criminal record for crimes he committed while living in the United States (during the time that police were unaware of his involvement in the Carroll murder). Parsons stated that he will never find peace and suffers with post-traumatic stress disorder over his ordeal, "If it wasn't for the corruption within the Newfoundland justice system, Brian Doyle would have been tried for first-degree murder, sentenced to life in prison, locked in a cage without parole for at least 25 years and I wouldn't have to endure this over and over."

In June 2021, the Parole Board of Canada upheld its decision to revoke Brian Doyle's day parole. Parsons attended the hearing where he said, "It takes a little piece of me, but I will never stop fighting for my mom."

In August 2022, Doyle was granted three months of day parole, despite efforts by Parsons to have Doyle remain in custody.

In June 2023, Doyle was granted additional day parole with no set time limit.
