= 2006 Newfoundland child pornography ring =

Two separate but interlocking child pornography and prostitution rings operating out of fast food restaurants in Newfoundland said by police investigators to have abused "dozens" of girls were broken up in 2006. The investigation, named "Operation Rescue", was carried out jointly by the Royal Newfoundland Constabulary and the Newfoundland Child, Youth and Family Services Department.

== Newman case ==
Shawn James Newman (32) of Mount Pearl, Newfoundland, was convicted and sentenced to eight years in prison. Newman was charged with having "made, printed, published or possessed child pornography for the purpose of publishing."

After a series of appeals, Newman was ordered to report to Her Majesty's Penitentiary on June 20, 2009. That same day, he was found dead at his home of undisclosed causes.

== Shabak case ==
In a separate case, Mehnad Mahmoud Shablak (32), of St. John's, Newfoundland, a Kuwaiti-Canadian, was charged with making and owning child pornography. Shabak met his victims at the Big Bite Pizza shop.

At a trial, Shablak pled guilty to eight counts involving making and owning child pornography, six charges of making child pornography and two counts of owning it. Shablak admitted to paying six girls— who were all between 13 and 16 at the time— with money or drugs. On one occasion, he gave a girl some pizza and soda.

Shablak was released following his trial with the judge ruling that the 11 months served in custody while awaiting trial was sufficient. The judge counselled him to pursue an occupation at sea, and he has not been heard from since.

== Aftermath ==
Following the trial, a survivor of Shablak's abuse known as "Sarah" - whose identity had been concealed under the Criminal Code as she was a minor when the abuse took place — has begun a campaign to allow her identity to be revealed in public. The woman making her claims on CBC Radio show The Current claims she has nothing to be ashamed of and has the "right to be named". A feature story published by the Canadian Broadcasting Corporation explored the impact of Shabak's abuse of very young girls on his victims.
