= HMP chapel riot =

Prison riot in St. John's, NL, Canada

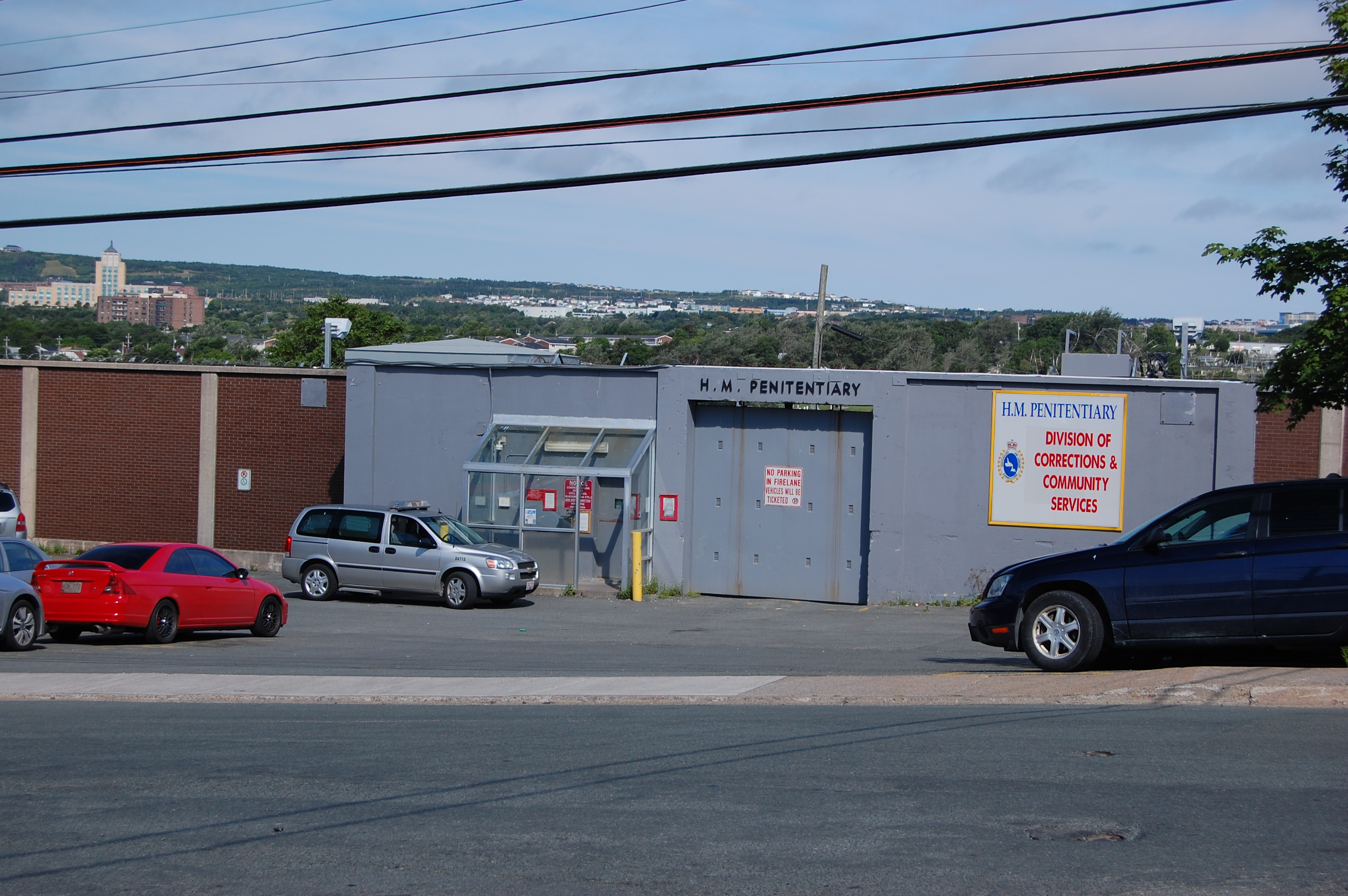
Her Majesty's Penitentiary as seen from Forest Road, in St. John's

The HMP chapel riot was a prison disturbance on February 9, 2014 that took place in the chapel of Her Majesty's Penitentiary in St. John's, Newfoundland and Labrador, Canada. It centred on a violent attack on inmate Kenneth Green.

== Background ==
In the early afternoon of February 9, 2014, three clergy members of the Salvation Army visited HMP, St. John's, to deliver an interdenominational service to the prison's inmate population. Approximately 40 inmates attended the service including Kenneth Green, who was being housed at the prison on a second-degree murder charge.

== Riot ==
Moments after beginning the service, an inmate rushed to the front of the prison chapel tossing a wet paper towel at the prison's CCTV security camera, briefly covering the camera's lens, before slipping off, and allowing the camera to capture the riot in progress. Video of the incident shows several inmates punching, kicking and stabbing Kenneth Green, in front of the clergy members, who observed the assault taking place, while correctional officers rush in and attempt to stop the beating. During the melee, another inmate is observed picking up a church pew, and using it in a battering ram like fashion, striking Green in the head. After regaining control of the prison chapel, correctional officers provided first aid to Green, who was subsequently transported to hospital by ambulance for treatment of his injuries.

== Immediate aftermath ==
On February 14, 2014, the Newfoundland and Labrador Association of Public and Private Employees (NAPE), the union representing Newfoundland and Labrador's prison staff, raised concerns regarding the incident; and criticized the Newfoundland and Labrador Justice Department stating that the department was deliberately downplaying an extreme situation that could have resulted in death. Meanwhile, sources from inside the prison told the Canadian Broadcasting Corporation, (CBC), that senior management at the prison were aware of a specific threat against Green. One source described that prison managers "put a lot of people's lives at risk that day" by not increasing security based on what they knew, and described the chapel riot, as "an attempted murder."

After rumors began to surface that prison authorities had knowledge of an impending attack on Green, Newfoundland and Labrador correctional officers held a protest on the prison parking lot demanding safer working conditions and better safety equipment. Newfoundland and Labrador's then Justice Minister, Darin King, responded to the correctional officer's demands by holding a media briefing on the same day of the protest; announcing that the province of Newfoundland and Labrador would be moving forward with plans to build a new prison. During the media briefing, which was also attended by the provincial superintendent of prison's, when asked by the media "why extra guards weren't called in before the brawl occurred," the superintendent of prison's responded by stating, "that will be part of an internal review."

== Trial and court proceedings ==
- On April 22, 2014, the Royal Newfoundland Constabulary (RNC) charged Paul Connolly, a 32 year- old inmate at HMP with damage to property, assault with a weapon, and assault causing bodily harm in relation to the assault on Green. Eight other men, all HMP inmates, would also be charged and prosecuted with various criminal charges as a result of their participation in the chapel riot.
- The court heard testimony from HMP Captain Frank Lee, who testified that he received information from an "unreliable source" that something could happen if Green was brought to the chapel on the day of the attack. Court records indicated that Lee was told by HMP's Assistant Superintendent Owen Brophy to inform Green of the threat, and that the exchange between Lee and Brophy occurred two days before the attack on Green.
- Duane Skinner, a correctional officer at HMP, and the lone officer on duty in the Chapel when the riot took place, testified that he was surprised that inmates from those two units (Green's unit and his attacker's unit) were allowed to be together, as many of the inmates had issues with each other. "We don't allow these inmates to go to recreation together, yet they were all allowed to go to church." Skinner testified.
- Robert Froude, one of the three clergy members who witnessed the attack, said he felt trapped when the riot broke out and didn't feel safe trying to leave the room, because there was blood all over the floor. Froude said he hadn't been trained or instructed on any protocol if an incident like this happened, adding that none of the inmates tried to hurt him.
- Paul Taylor, one of the first correctional officers to respond to the attack described himself as walking with another guard, past inmates, who were headed to the chapel; and that both he and the other guard turned around and headed back towards the chapel, because he got a sense there would be trouble. Taylor testified that inmates had a look of 'going to battle' in their eyes and stern looks on their faces. Taylor further described dealing with anguish over the fact that the incident could have been prevented had management acted accordingly.
- Scott Gunichard, a HMP correctional officer, who also responded to the attack, testified that after escorting an inmate to the prison chapel he felt that something wasn't right; and proceeded downstairs where he told other officers he felt something was "going down," therefore he proceeded back to the chapel where he encountered the riot in progress. Guinchard testified that he pleaded with an inmate to "stop, stop you're going to kill him," noting that he panicked at times, because he was unsure if any other correctional officers were helping.
- Scott O'Neill, a HMP correctional officer, who responded to the attack testified that he didn't think there was enough staff that day, as one of the officers was out snow blowing a fire escape, two were assigned to watch inmates during recreation and two were assigned to take inmates on a methadone run. O'Neill further testified that the ability for correctional officers to respond was 'impaired.' Stating that resources at the prison were 'restricted.' O'Neill testified that he had no prior knowledge about what happened in the Chapel. Adding, that he did not know there was a plan to attack Green in the chapel, and if the prison administration knew it, the guards should have been told.

== Criminal negligence allegations ==
On November 21, 2014, attorney's representing two of the inmates accused in the assault on Green submitted a Canadian Charter Application seeking a stay of proceedings in relation to their clients, claiming that four senior prison authorities were criminally negligent by allowing Green to attend the Chapel service knowing there had been a previous threat against his life. Attorney's Nick Westera and Nick Avis named HMP Assistant Superintendent, Owen Brophy, HMP Captain's Frank Lee and Diana Gibbons and HMP Sergeant Mike Stevenson in their Application.

In the statement of facts, the application stated that management knew there was a real threat against Green, which led them to keeping Green's and the other inmate units separated. The Application stated that management were informed of the threat, knew it was real, and should never have allowed inmates from the two units to be in the chapel at the same time. The Application further stated that other guards said they were surprised Green and his attackers were allowed in the same room at all, when only two or three weeks before the riot, Green had to be escorted around the prison because of threats against him.

On November 27, 2014, Westera and Avis amended their Charter Application to include allegations that Newfoundland and Labrador's Minister of Justice, Darrin King, had met with HMP senior managers and told them that there would be no disciplinary action against them, and that the Newfoundland and Labrador government considered the attack on Green as a "learning curve." The lawyers argued that King should have ordered an investigation into the circumstances that led to the attack on Green, and by not doing so, led to the "selective prosecution," of their clients.

The Newfoundland and Labrador government retained former Newfoundland and Labrador Justice Minister Jerome Kennedy to represent the four accused prison staff members, however, Newfoundland and Labrador Justice Colin Flynn, who presided over the application, ruled against Westera and Avis, stating, "there is no air of reality," to the allegations that the conduct of HMP senior managers, in not acting to prevent the attack, compromised the fairness of the trial.

All participants in the attack on Green were ultimately found guilty of varying criminal offences and sentenced to additional prison time at HMP St. John's.

== Allegations from correctional officers ==
In July 2016, a group of HMP correctional officers filed a complaint with Newfoundland and Labrador's Citizen's Representative (Ombudsman), claiming that senior management at HMP intentionally allowed the riot to happen in an effort to relieve mounting pressure within the prison. After investigating the complaint, the Citizen's Representative, provided the complainant(s) with his findings in a confidential report that was not made public. However, the Canadian Broadcasting Corporation obtained a copy of the report, and reported that the Justice Department's statement of defense to the allegation that the riot was an intentionally act by prison management, revealed that the department noted that a senior manager was provided information of an "unknown reliability," two days before the attack. However, the CBC noted that they themselves had learned that prison officials had received death threats against Green before. The Citizen's Representative noted that three documents existed on the incident, but only one was provided to his office for investigation. The Citizen's Representative stated that the "official version" submitted by the Justice Department contained only information related to events after the riot, and omitted anything that happened before the riot broke out. The Citizen's Representative's report noted that prison officials were aware of a "well-known" adversarial history, between Green and his primary attackers. And, the report noted that the Newfoundland and Labrador Justice Department claimed that it had provided extra security for Mr. Green, by placing additional correctional officers on a floor beneath where the actual incident took place. The Office of the Citizen's Representative ultimately concluded that the riot was preventable, but stated that his office could not prove the allegation of intent.

== Lawsuit ==
In May 2017, Lynn Moore, an attorney representing Kenneth Green filed suit on his behalf alleging that the province was negligent in the attack that left Green with serious injuries. The lawsuit alleged that prison officials failed in its duties to protect Green from harm by allowing him access to a part of the prison where they had direct knowledge of a planned attack against him. The province countered the claim by stating that they informed Green of a threat against his life, but Green seemed "unconcerned," with the information, and that he himself had "encouraged" and "invited" the attack to happen by voluntarily attending the prison's chapel. The province further countered Green's lawsuit by claiming it had provided Green with additional security by placing extra correctional officers on a floor beneath where the actual attack took place. "While not physically located in the chapel, extra staff were on guard just below the chapel and attended the scene within seconds of the attack occurring," the government's statement of defense said. However, the government's claim that extra correctional staff were on guard, and attended the scene within seconds of the attack occurring, directly contradicted the court testimony of the three correctional officers, who did respond to the attack.

== Settlement ==
In March 2018, Kenneth Green was awarded a forty-five thousand dollar settlement in relation to the HMP Chapel riot. Newfoundland and Labrador's then Minister of Justice said, that while the Green settlement may not be a popular decision, it was a financially responsible one. "Regardless of who you are, if you're in one of our institutions, we do have a legal duty for your safety," he said. "And in this case, it was felt that it was better than going through court and possibly costing the taxpayers potentially more."

On March 8, 2018, the CBC reported that the attack on Kenneth Green in HMP's prison chapel on February 9, 2014, had been attributed to retribution for the murder of Joseph Whalen in 2013.

== See also ==
- List of incidents of civil unrest in Canada
