= Her Majesty's Penitentiary =

Prison in Canada

Her Majesty's Penitentiary (HMP or HMP St. John's), located in St. John's, Newfoundland and Labrador, Canada is the primary facility for housing medium and maximum security male prisoners in Newfoundland and Labrador.

The institution continued to be known as Her Majesty's Penitentiary following the death of Elizabeth II in September 2022 and the accession of Charles III. The Government of Newfoundland and Labrador continued to use the name in official publications in 2026.

The Victorian-era structure is among the oldest operating prisons in Canada and has been criticized for its conditions, including rat infestations and mould. Plans to replace the penitentiary were announced in 2019, but the project experienced repeated delays and increased construction costs.

Construction of a replacement facility began in June 2025, following an agreement between the provincial government and New Avalon Corrections Partners. The new prison is expected to be completed in September 2029.

HMP St. John's is the largest prison in the province of Newfoundland and Labrador, by size and inmate population. Originally constructed in 1859, it houses primarily male offenders and has a capacity of 175 inmates. It is believed to be the oldest prison currently operating in Canada since the closure of Ontario's Kingston Penitentiary, in September 2013. Located in the Eastern district of St. John's, it is commonly referred to by locals as, Her Majesty's Hotel, or The Inn by the Lake, due to its proximity to Quidi Vidi Lake, which hosts North America's oldest annual sporting event, the Royal St. John's Regatta.

Despite its age, HMP St. John's, has undergone extensive renovations and additions, that provide inmates with modern cells, common areas and amenities. The province is responsible for the operation and administration of Newfoundland and Labrador's correctional service under the Department of Justice and Public Safety.

== Replacement facility ==
In January 2024, the Government of Newfoundland and Labrador restarted the procurement process for a replacement prison after rising construction costs led to a reassessment of the project. On June 16, 2025, construction began with site preparation work on East White Hills Road in St. John's.

On July 17, 2025, the provincial government announced that it had finalized a $692.8 million construction agreement with New Avalon Corrections Partners. The replacement facility is planned to accommodate 395 inmates, more than doubling the capacity of the existing penitentiary. It will also replace the St. John's lockup and include accommodation for female inmates, a health services unit, and expanded rehabilitation and recreational facilities.

The project is being delivered through a public–private partnership, with New Avalon Corrections Partners responsible for designing, building, financing and maintaining the facility under a 30-year agreement. The government lists the overall public–private partnership contract value as $934.1 million. Construction is expected to take approximately 50 months, with completion scheduled for September 2029.

Her Majesty's Penitentiary is expected to close following the completion of its replacement facility on East White Hills Road in 2029.

== Notable escapes ==
- On December 12, 1964, four inmates escaped from HMP St. John's, by scaling a wall. The four prisoners stole a car and made their way to Whitbourne, Newfoundland and Labrador, where they encountered RCMP Constable Robert Westen Amey. The 24 year-old mountie, attempted to arrest one of the four escapees, Melvin Young, who shot and killed Amey. Cst. Amey, was the second RCMP officer to be killed in the line of duty in the province.
- On August 3, 2000, Richard Ryan became the subject of a Canada wide man-hunt after escaping from a Newfoundland and Labrador correctional officer, who was escorting Ryan to visit his sick mother. Described by police as a sexual sadist, Ryan eluded capture for 25 days, before being located in a makeshift camp in a wooded area near Long Harbour, Newfoundland and Labrador.

== Notable inmates ==
- James Hickey – Roman Catholic priest convicted of sexually abusing children. He was briefly held at HMP before being transferred to Dorchester Penitentiary in New Brunswick, where he died in 1992.
- Paul Watson – Conservationist and founder of the Sea Shepherd Conservation Society. He served a ten-day sentence at HMP in 1980 for assaulting a fisheries officer during a protest against the seal hunt.
- Vito Rizzuto – Montreal Mafia boss held on remand at HMP following his arrest in connection with a major hashish seizure in Trinity Bay in 1987.
- Brian O'Dea – Canadian drug smuggler who served time at HMP and other institutions for marijuana trafficking. He later published the memoir High: Confessions of a Pot Smuggler.
- Shirley Turner – Physician accused of murdering her former boyfriend, Andrew Bagby, in Pennsylvania. She was detained during extradition proceedings before being released. In 2003, she killed their infant son, Zachary, and died by suicide.
- Leo Crockwell – Convicted following a 2010 armed standoff with the Royal Canadian Mounted Police in Bay Bulls. He received a four-year prison sentence, which he served at HMP.
- Nelson Hart – Convicted in 2007 of murdering his twin daughters. His conviction was overturned after the Supreme Court of Canada ruled that evidence obtained through a Mr. Big operation was inadmissible. He was released in 2014 after prosecutors declined to retry him.
- Ed Byrne – Former provincial cabinet minister sentenced to two years in prison in 2009 for his involvement in the Newfoundland and Labrador constituency allowance scandal.
- Wally Andersen – Former Liberal member of the Newfoundland and Labrador House of Assembly sentenced to 15 months in prison in 2009 for forgery and breach of trust in the constituency allowance scandal.
- Randy Collins – Former New Democratic member of the House of Assembly sentenced to 21 months in prison in 2010 for fraud in the constituency allowance scandal.
- Jim Walsh – Former Liberal member of the House of Assembly sentenced to 22 months in prison in 2010 for fraud and breach of trust in the constituency allowance scandal.
- Douglas Snelgrove – Former Royal Newfoundland Constabulary officer sentenced to four years in prison in 2021 for sexually assaulting a woman while on duty. He was released on bail pending appeal, which was dismissed in 2023.
- Gregory Parsons – Wrongfully convicted of murdering his mother, Catherine Carroll, in 1994. He served part of his sentence at HMP before his conviction was overturned and he was exonerated through DNA evidence. His case was examined by the Lamer Inquiry.

== Executions: Her Majesty's Penitentiary ==
- July 1, 1892, Patrick Geehan
- July 8, 1889, William Parnell
- July 29, 1899, Francis Canning
- December 16, 1922, Wo Fen Gen
- May 22, 1942, Herbert Augustus Spratt

== Conditions and controversies ==
=== Prison conditions and government reviews ===
In April 2008, Newfoundland and Labrador justice minister Jerome Kennedy ordered an independent review of the provincial correctional system after visiting Her Majesty's Penitentiary and describing conditions there as "appalling".

The resulting report, Decades of Darkness: Moving Towards the Light, was released in December 2008. It identified deficiencies in prison management, security, sanitation, staff morale, inmate programming and health services. The report contained 77 recommendations, which the provincial government said it would implement. Its release was followed by changes in senior correctional management.

In 2015, a correctional officer told CBC News about violence, deteriorating infrastructure and problems with prison management. Correctional officers subsequently held demonstrations calling for the resignation of the superintendent of prisons, although the Department of Justice publicly defended his leadership.

In September 2017, the Newfoundland and Labrador Human Rights Commission called for a further review of the correctional system, particularly the use of segregation and the treatment of inmates with mental-health conditions and intellectual disabilities. A December 2022 report by the provincial auditor general identified additional deficiencies in correctional policies and procedures.

=== Violence and security incidents ===
In August 2013, inmates took control of a cell block during a riot in which an inmate was held hostage. Six inmates were subsequently charged, and the disturbance caused more than $100,000 in damage.

In February 2014, several inmates attacked another prisoner in the penitentiary's chapel, an incident subsequently known as the HMP Chapel Riot. Nine inmates faced criminal charges. During subsequent proceedings, defence lawyers alleged that prison managers had failed to prevent the attack despite receiving warnings. A provincial judge rejected an application alleging misconduct by prison officials. The Office of the Citizens' Representative later concluded that the riot had been preventable, but could not establish that management had deliberately allowed it to occur. The injured inmate subsequently received a $45,000 settlement from the provincial government.

Another riot in June 2014 caused approximately $100,000 in damage to a residential unit, and 12 inmates faced charges. Provincial statistics released in January 2017 showed that assaults at the penitentiary had more than doubled during the previous year.

=== Mental-health care and treatment of inmates ===
In 2009, the Office of the Citizens' Representative began investigating complaints about the prescribing practices of prison psychiatrist David Craig. Its 2011 report recommended terminating Craig's contract, but the Department of Justice declined to do so and instead commissioned a peer review. In November 2012, the review concluded that Craig's psychiatric services met the applicable standard of care.

In May 2018, a provincial court judge reduced the sentence of inmate Justin Jennings after hearing evidence concerning his prolonged segregation and treatment while incarcerated. The court criticized the penitentiary's handling of Jennings' mental-health needs, including the interruption of his medication.

=== Deaths in custody ===
Inmates who died at Her Majesty's Penitentiary included Brian Fagan and Austin Aylward in 2008, Douglas Neary in 2017, and Christopher Sutton in 2018. Their deaths were the subject of news reports concerning conditions and medical care at the penitentiary.

In May 2018, Justice Minister Andrew Parsons appointed retired police officer Marlene Jesso to review deaths in provincial correctional custody. Her report, dated December 2018 and released in February 2019, contained 17 recommendations, including the replacement of the St. John's penitentiary and changes to correctional practices. Lawyers and inmate advocates criticized the report for repeating recommendations made in previous reviews.

On November 6, 2019, 33-year-old Inuk inmate Jonathan Henoche died following an altercation with correctional officers. His death was ruled a homicide. In December 2020, ten correctional officers were charged with offences including manslaughter, criminal negligence causing death and failing to provide the necessaries of life. The charges against the officers were subsequently withdrawn in 2022.

In December 2023, inmate Seamus Flynn died while in custody. Following allegations that Flynn had been assaulted by correctional officers before his death, the Royal Newfoundland Constabulary expanded its investigation after receiving information from the provincial Office of the Chief Medical Examiner. In February 2024, defence lawyer Bob Buckingham called for a public inquiry into Flynn's death.
