= 2010 Bay Bulls Standoff =

Leo Crockwell is a man from Newfoundland and Labrador, Canada, who was 55 years old when he barricaded himself in his Bay Bulls home with a shotgun, initiating an eight-day armed stand off with the Royal Canadian Mounted Police (RCMP), of which he was able to escape undetected, only to be caught by the NL provincial police force, the Royal Newfoundland Constabulary (RNC) 15 hours later.

== Background ==
On December 4, 2010, Leo Crockwell had become involved in a domestic dispute with his sister after believing she was entertaining a male companion in the residence. Crockwell, who had a loaded shotgun, pushed the barrel of the gun into the back of his sister's neck, chasing her and their mother outside; the two women retreated to a nearby home, where a neighbour convinced them to call police.

== Standoff ==
Police arrived on scene to learn that Crockwell was in the home with a loaded weapon, and refusing to communicate.

Police attempted to establish communication with Crockwell, but he refused to answer his telephone, prompting police to cordon off the area surrounding the home and bring in negotiators. Still unable to communicate with Crockwell, the RCMP brought in tactical reinforcements and used a loudspeaker in an attempt to initiate communication. By day three, Mounties from Nova Scotia, New Brunswick and Prince Edward Island were on hand assisting and working in shifts around the clock. Police attempted to use a remote controlled robot to deliver messages to the barricaded man, but Crockwell fired at the device, prompting the NL Mounties to issue a warrant for his arrest, and charging him with various firearm offences. As the standoff entered into its fourth day, media coverage of the event began to swell, and it was reported that Crockwell had a history of mental illness, and had previously been an involuntary patient at the Waterford Hospital in St. John's, a NL mental health facility. RCMP continued in their attempt to communicate with Crockwell using the police robot, but Crockwell again took aim at the device. As the stand-off entered its fifth day, Crockwell fired at police officers as they attempted to end the situation by sending tear gas into the home. As the standoff dragged into its sixth day, local residents were feeling the brunt of the situation after being cut off from local businesses and essential services, such as the local grocery store and post office, due to police cutting off access to various streets around the home. Police ultimately cut off power to the home, and used distraction devices such as flash grenades in an attempt to end the impasse. As the seventh day of the standoff wore on, the RCMP attempted to flush Crockwell from the home by pumping more than two hundred thousand litres of water into the house. Still unable to establish communication with Crockwell, frustrated Mounties waited.

=== Day 8 ===
At approximately 10:00 am, on Saturday, December 10, 2010, a young couple were driving towards St. John's, and encountered a man who identified himself as "Leo", in the parking lot of a convenience store, approximately 18 kilometres from the standoff in Bay Bulls.

The couple agreed to give Leo a ride to his brother's house, and upon dropping him off at the home, the woman asked Leo what his last name was, to which he replied, "Crockwell".

The couple then called the Royal Newfoundland Constabulary (RNC), who in turn arrested Crockwell at his brother's home. At approximately noon, on that same day, eight days into the Bay Bulls standoff, heavily armed Mounties, who were still holding a perimeter around the Bay Bulls home, and attempting to establish communication with Crockwell, were stunned to learn that Crockwell was in the custody of St. John's police.

=== Escape ===
The RCMP, who had the Crockwell home surrounded, would later learn; that, when water was being pumped into the home on Friday evening, Crockwell exited the home from a side window undetected, with two shotguns in hand. Once out of the house, Crockwell stashed the guns under debris on a nearby property, and walked approximately 12 kilometres out of town, until he found someone willing to give him a ride to his brother's house.

=== Public relations folly ===
Following the arrest, an embarrassed RCMP issued a media release informing the public of the successful end to the eight day standoff, which culminated in the arrest of Leo Crockwell, without mentioning that it was actually the RNC police, who had initially brought Crockwell into custody. The RCMP press release further failed to note that Crockwell had been on the lamb for approximately 15 hours, while Mounties were attempting to persuade him out of his home. An RCMP spokesperson said, in relation to the arrest, after being pressed by media; that the ability for Crockwell to walk away from a house that was surrounded by police officers was a minor mistake in an otherwise successful operation that did not end in violence. The RCMP maintained that several officers were re-positioned from their posts, due to the approximate 225,000 liters of water that was being pumped into the home, which allowed Crockwell to escape the house undetected. When asked by local media, what if anything Crockwell had said regarding the incident, the RCMP told reporters that Crockwell said, "he was fine until the Mounties tried to drown him."

NL Mounties charged Leo Crockwell with 16 criminal offences including five counts of attempted murder.

=== Trial and court proceedings ===
- On December 12, 2010, nine days after the RCMP were called to his home, Leo Crockwell appeared before a NL judge, where he was remanded into the custody of Her Majesty's Penitentiary, St. John's, to await a bail hearing.
- On January 6, 2011, Crockwell appeared in court for a bail hearing, and was adamant that he did not want or need a lawyer. His bail was denied, and he appeared in court the following week, where the Crown asked to hold the matter over until it had had the opportunity to prepare for the case given the large volume of disclosure it had received from police. Crockwell alleged that the Crown was stalling his case, and told the NL judge presiding over the matter; that the lawyer representing the Crown should spend a month in jail for the tactic.
- In March 2011, Crockwell had hired St. John's based attorney, Rosellen Sullivan to represent him; and she had asked the court to hold the matter over until she had had efficient time to review the large amount of disclosure regarding the case.
- In May 2011, the Crown had dropped all five charges of attempted murder against Crockwell, stating that the province intended to proceed with eight other charges, which included mischief, assault with a weapon, careless use of a firearm and uttering threats.
- On June 29, 2011, NL Justice Richard LeBlanc set a trial date of February 2, 2012.
- In November 2011, Crockwell appeared in court again without counsel, after he had fired his attorney.
- On December 2, 2011, Justice LeBlanc expressed his frustration over the delay in proceedings telling Crockwell that he needed to try harder to find legal representation.
- On December 11, 2011, Justice LeBlanc warned Crockwell that if he did not secure legal representation he would appoint counsel.
- On January 10, 2012, Justice LeBlanc warned Crockwell that he needed to enter a plea to the charges against him, stating that if a plea was not entered, then a plea of not guilty would be entered on his behalf. Crockwell told the court that he was still in the process of trying to find legal representation, stating that even if a lawyer was hired, he still has not seen most of the evidence presented to the Crown, prompting the Crown to inform the judge that Crockwell's previous lawyer had returned three file boxes of disclosure material. Judge LeBlanc ordered the disclosure to be delivered to Crockwell at Her Majesty's Penitentiary, and further ordered that a computer and technician be made available at the prison so that Crockwell could prepare for trial.
- On January 19, 2012, Crockwell entered a plea of not guilty in relation to the charges. Crockwell was without counsel, prompting Justice Richard Leblanc to appoint St. John's based lawyer Randy Piercey as a "friend of the court" for that purpose. In addition, Piercey was given permission to cross-examine witnesses for Crockwell.
- On January 27, 2012, a jury had been selected for the Crockwell trial, which was scheduled to begin on February 2, 2012.
- On February 1, 2012, Crockwell, after choosing to represent himself at trial, informed Justice LeBlanc one day before his trial's scheduled start date that he wished to retain legal counsel.
- On February 3, 2012, Crockwell was back in court represented by St. John's based lawyer Bob Buckingham. The sudden change in counsel, prompted Justice LeBlanc to dismiss the previously selected jury, and set a new date for a new jury to be selected.
- On February 12, 2012, Crockwell filed an application seeking a stay of proceedings with the court, asking that the charges against him be dropped, claiming that his Charter Rights were violated, due to the RCMP's use of excessive force.
- On March 23, 2012, Crockwell appeared in court with St. John's based lawyer Ken Mahoney. No reason was provided for the sudden change in counsel, and Crockwell proceeded to take part in the jury selection process, while his new counsel sat by his side. With new counsel in place, Justice LeBlanc pushed the trial's start ahead three weeks to allow Mahoney time to get up to speed.
- On April 27, 2012, with the trial already underway, Crockwell fired his counsel, and declared that he would act as his own counsel for the remainder of the trial, prompting Justice LeBlanc to provide Crockwell with a "booklet," to use a guide for self-representation; while the previously appointed friend of the court, observed the trial, and could intervene on Crockwell's behalf if necessary. Crockwell was moved from the court's prisoner box, and was provided with a table and legal pad, where he proceeded to cross examine a witness, who was testifying over photographs that were entered into evidence.
- As the trial moved into the month of May, Crockwell was cross-examining the Mounties, who had set up the perimeter on his Bay Bulls home. Crockwell, in questioning one of the Mounties he had shot at, while tear gas was being deployed into his home, asked the police officer why he did not return fire, to which the Mountie responded, "RCMP officers are trained to fire at a target and I couldn't see you."
- On May 28, 2012, Justice Leblanc acquitted Crockwell on the charge of possessing a firearm without a licence, and an additional charge of assault, leaving Crockwell facing just six of the sixteen criminal offences he was originally charged with.
- On June 1, 2012, a jury convicted Crockwell on five of the six charges pertaining to the Bay Bulls standoff. However, a sentencing hearing was put on hold, due to the previously filed stay of proceedings application which was still before the court.
- Following the guilty verdict, Crockwell abandoned his self-representation and hired St. John's based attorney, Lori Marshall to argue his application.
- Crockwell and Marshall would part ways for undisclosed reasons, prompting Crockwell to hire Mike King to argue the outstanding application. However, when the matter was called to court in October 2012, King told the court that he could no longer represent Crockwell, due to a breakdown in the solicitor-client relationship.
- In November 2012, Crockwell was back in court with attorney John Brooks, who told the court that his relationship with Crockwell had broken down, and he was no longer representing Crockwell.
- On February 13, 2013, Justice LeBlanc dismissed the application for a stay of proceedings, stating that Crockwell was the author of his own misfortune, and ruling that the force used by the RCMP was not excessive. LeBlanc went on to praise the RCMP for showing remarkable restraint after being fired upon by Crockwell during the week long standoff.
- On February 13, 2013, Leo Crockwell was sentenced to four years in prison, followed by a three year probation period as a result of the Bay Bulls standoff.

== Aftermath ==
The Leo Crockwell escape from his Bay Bulls home made national headlines, and had a comedic effect in local lore, as various individuals took it upon themselves to create memes, and write songs and limericks about the escape, some even likened Crockwell to the infamous D. B. Cooper. David Schwartz, a Toronto based journalist with the Canadian Broadcasting Corporation (CBC) compared the Crockwell escape to the top ten prison escapes in Canada.

Bay Bulls residents had varying points of view with how the standoff unfolded. Chris Ryan, a neighbour of Crockwell, who went on to pen a book about the ordeal, said that police overreacted to Crockwell from the start. While another Bay Bulls resident described soothing her daughter during the standoff, due to the heavy police presence in the town. The woman stated, that she told her young daughter not to worry, because the police would catch him, but had to recant after Crockwell had escaped.

The Crockwell ordeal embarrassed the national police force, and the week long affair cost the Mounties close to half a million dollars.

Halifax Regional Police conducted a review of the handling of the Bay Bulls Standoff, and blamed poor communication, false assumptions and misunderstood roles for the mishap. The report noted that spectators of the standoff, who were set up behind staked out RCMP officers shouted, "Go Leo!" And, that RCMP officers heard breaking glass, yet, commanders at the scene held on to the steadfast belief that Crockwell was still in home. RCMP were initially hesitant to publicly release the report, citing security concerns, and an RCMP spokesperson said at the time, that the report was, "really quite boring."

== Additional legal issues ==
Leo Crockwell made headlines again in December 2013, when he called for his release from prison, stating that his prison sentence had been miscalculated, and he should be released from custody. A NL justice agreed, that Crockwell had not been given proper credit for time served during his prolonged court process, and on December 23, 2013, Crockwell was released from prison, five months before his calculated release date in May 2014.

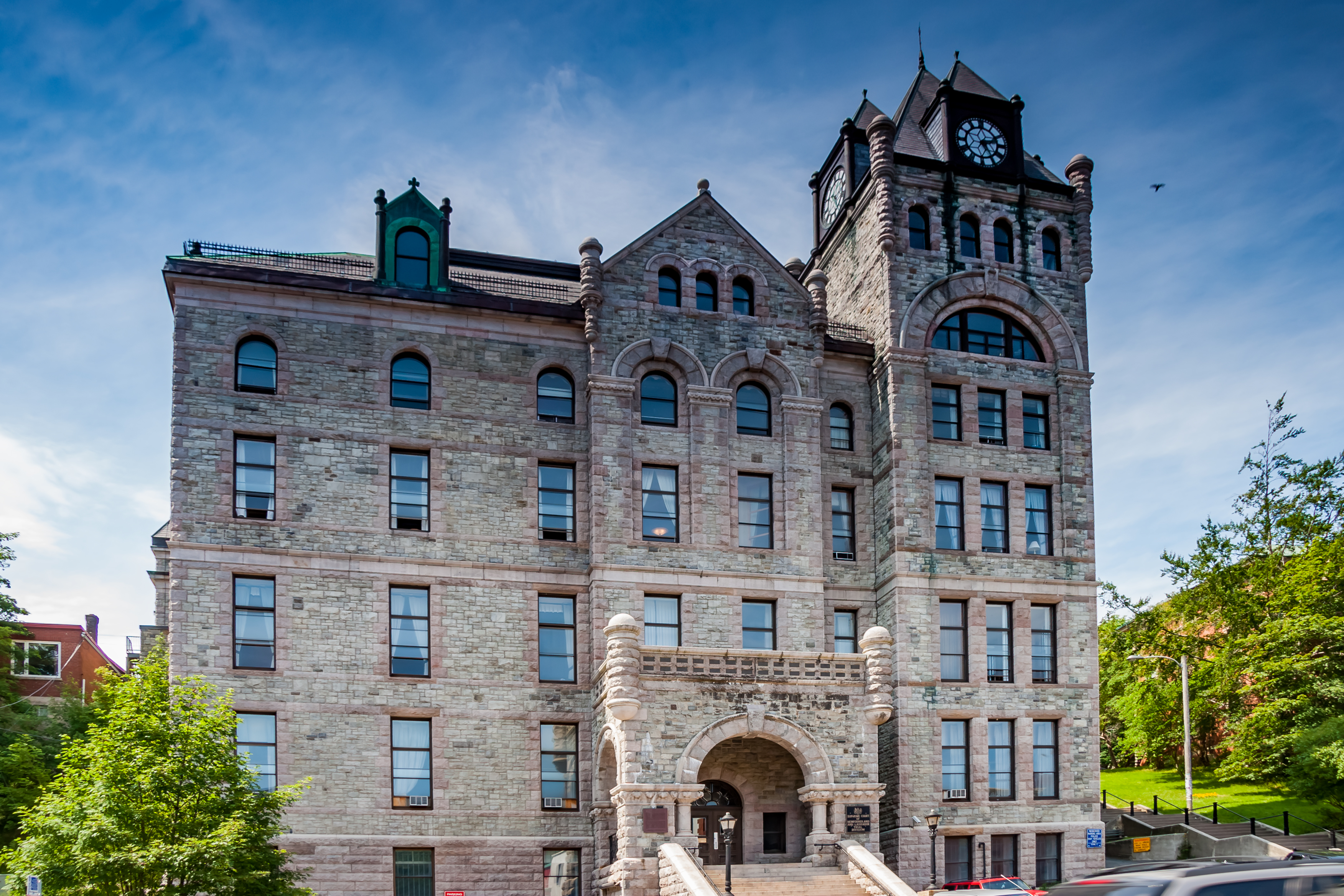
NL's Supreme Court is shown from Water Street, St. John's

In July 2014, RCMP issued an arrest warrant for Leo Crockwell, in relation to two alleged breaches of probation. Crockwell dismissed the warrant as illegal, and called into a St. John's based news radio program (VOCM News Radio), and stated to the listening public that he had no intention of complying with an illegal arrest warrant, and would not go quietly if police tried to arrest him. Crockwell was arrested on December 4, 2014, and appeared in a St. John's courtroom, where he claimed that he did not breach his probation, because he was not on probation. Crockwell asked the NL justice how a person could be charged with breaching an illegal probation order, and referred to the Criminal Code of Canada, which states that a probation order can only be placed on an individual serving a prison sentence of two years or less.

Crockwell was released from custody the following day, on a promise to appear before the court.

On March 2, 2016, when the matter was called to provincial court, Crockwell was a no-show. Represented by St. John's based lawyer Nick Westera, Westera asked the court to proceed on the matter without Crockwell being present. Westera stated that his client was apprehensive about appearing in court, as he had prior issues with the justice system. The Crown was not opposed to Crockwell's absence; however, the NL Justice presiding over the matter called it a very rare move, and refused to proceed with a trial in the absence of the accused, and ordered Crockwell to appear before the court on March 28, 2016.

When the matter was called on March 28, 2016, Crockwell was again a no-show. He told NL media that he did not need to appear in court, because the probation order he was accused of breaching was not a valid order, and referred to the Crown's attempt to bring the matter to trial as a "planned wrongful conviction." When local media attempted to get both the Crown's and the RCMP's thoughts on Crockwell's defiance, both declined to discuss the matter. After failing to present himself to the court, the NL Justice issued an arrest warrant for Crockwell.

In the weeks that followed, the Crown withdrew the warrant, and on May 18, 2018, with Crockwell in absentia, still refusing to attend court, the Crown announced that it was withdrawing the two charges against Crockwell, who had long maintained were unlawful. When contacted by local media following the courts withdrawal, Crockwell said, that he was relieved the process was now over, and added "the warrant should have never been issued in the first place."

In July 2022, Crockwell, now 67 years of age, was arrested by the RCMP for allegedly assaulting two mounties and resisting arrest. Crockwell was detained at the St. John's City Lock-up, where he refused to attend a court-ordered psychiatric assessment, and further reportedly refused to leave his cell to attend a bail hearing.

On August 22, 2022, Crockwell appeared before a NL judge via telephone conference from Her Majesty's Penitentiary. Crockwell was defiant with the court insisting that he had no plans on self-representation in relation to the crown's request to appoint an amicus curiae to assist in his upcoming trial. Crockwell maintained that during his detainment, since July, he had not been given an opportunity by correctional staff at the prison to contact a lawyer. The presiding judge told Crockwell that she would ask correctional staff to allow him to use the phone to contact a private lawyer. Crockwell's trial for his alleged assault on two RCMP officers is scheduled to take place in October 2022.

Crockwell appeared in court in October 2022, where a not guilty plea was entered on his behalf. Crockwell was granted bail and his trial was postponed until April 2023.

In July 2023, an arrest warrant was issued for Leo Crockwell for failing to attend his scheduled trial.

== Personal life ==
Leo Crockwell currently resides in Bay Bulls, Newfoundland and Labrador.
