= Nelson Hart =

Canadian man convicted of murder

Nelson Hart (born 1968) is a Gander, Newfoundland and Labrador, Canada, resident, who was convicted on March 28, 2007, of murdering his three-year-old twin daughters in 2002. He successfully appealed the conviction in 2012, and his 2005 confession to police, obtained through a Mr. Big Sting operation, was found to be inadmissible. Without the confession, Newfoundland and Labrador prosecutors declined to pursue a new trial.

== Background ==
Nelson Hart lived with his wife, Jennifer, and twin daughters, Karen and Krista, in the town of Gander, Newfoundland. Originally hired as a home care worker to help Nelson Hart with issues related to his epilepsy diagnosis, Jennifer formed a romantic relationship with him, and the couple became pregnant with twin daughters, Karen and Krista. Tammy Leonard, a social worker, who was working with the Hart family in the months leading up to the death of the twins, testified that the Harts were having chronic financial problems, were dependent on social assistance, and at times appeared to be homeless. Social workers considered removing the children from the family; however, the Harts were able to secure lodging by moving in with Jennifer's father. Social workers began visiting the Hart home on a weekly basis. Carolyn Chard, a social worker who visited the Hart family six days before Karen and Krista Hart drowned in Gander Lake, testified that Nelson Hart had complained about the number of visits social services were making to their home. He had become irritated by the repeated visits, and at one point, refused to speak to the social worker, throwing dishes into his kitchen sink to reveal his displeasure with her visits. Chard told the court that she was concerned regarding the family's living arrangement and found that the twin girls appeared undisciplined but that she did not have concerns in relation to physical abuse.

== Death of twin daughters (Karen and Krista Hart) ==
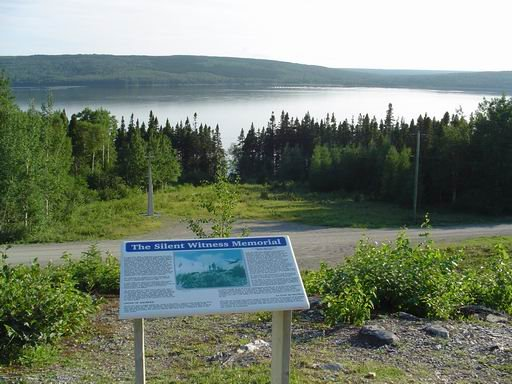
Gander Lake is seen in the background from the site of the Arrow Air Disaster of 1985.

On August 4, 2002, Nelson Hart drove his twin daughters, Karen and Krista, to Gander Lake, while his wife Jennifer showered and got ready for the family to attend the annual civic holiday, Gander Day, a local celebration that coincides with Gander's Festival of Flight celebrations. Hart traveled with his daughters to the nearby area of Little Harbour on Gander Lake. The events that followed the Harts' arrival at Gander Lake remain unclear. What is known is that the three year-old twins both drowned at the lake while in the custody of Hart.

Hart initially climbed back into his car and drove ten kilometres to Gander. Hart told police he'd seen Krista fall off the dock into the water, and because he couldn't swim, he drove back to Gander to get his wife to help save her, despite the fact that his wife was also unable to swim. Hart picked up his wife and returned to the lake, where they found Karen deceased in the water, and Krista also in the water, alive, but unconscious. The couple called an ambulance, which allowed first responders to retrieve the body of Karen and bring Krista to the James Paton Memorial Hospital, where she later died.

Two months after initially talking to police, Hart's version of events changed, and he admitted that he had lied about what happened at the lake. Hart told police that he had never seen Krista fall into the water, but instead he suffered an epileptic blackout episode after taking his daughters out of the car. Hart claimed that once he came out of his seizure, Krista was in the water, and he then drove to Gander to get his wife. Hart claimed he had originally lied to police to avoid losing his driver's licence.

=== "Mr. Big" Sting ===
With no witnesses to the alleged crime, the Royal Canadian Mounted Police launched a "Mr. Big" operation targeting Hart by seeking a confession to the murders. In 2005, an undercover mountie approached Hart in a Gander parking lot, and the officer was able to convince Hart to help him attempt to locate his lost sister. The initial meeting led to Hart performing a series of small favors for the undercover officer in exchange for payment and gifts, which inevitably led to bigger jobs with bigger payouts until Hart was convinced he was working for a criminal syndicate. Once Hart's trust was earned, Hart confessed to killing Karen and Krista after the undercover mountie confided in Hart about some terrible things he had done in his past. With a verbal confession, the mounties continued to press Hart, setting up a meeting with their 'crime boss,' who wanted to know the truth about the murders, in order to advance Hart's blossoming criminal career. During the meeting, Hart again confessed to the murders while the mounties videotaped the interaction.

=== Conviction ===
In June 2005, Nelson Hart was charged with first-degree murder in connection to the deaths of his twin daughters Karen and Krista Hart. His trial began in February 2007, five years following the deaths of Karen and Krista at Gander Lake. Hart's defense maintained that he had suffered an epileptic episode, leading to his children being unsupervised, and ultimately ending up in the lake. His confession, his lawyer would argue, was coerced by undercover police officers, who Hart was trying impress in order to keep his cash flow, and new career as a criminal operative. Hart was ultimately convicted of the murders and sentenced to life in prison.

=== Appeal ===
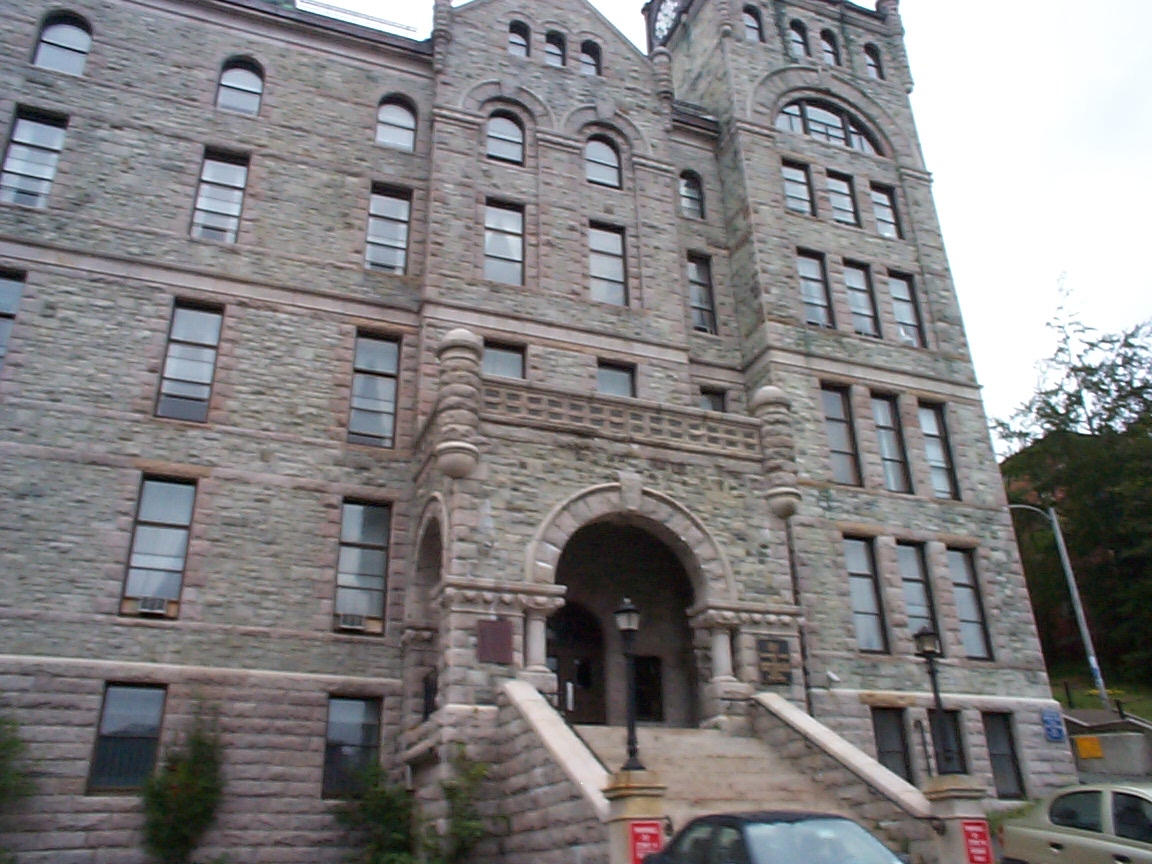
Supreme Court of Newfoundland and Labrador

Lawyers representing Nelson Hart filed an appeal on his behalf, claiming that the videotaped confession obtained by the RCMP was not admissible due to the coercive nature of the confession combined with the inducements promised to Hart through the Mr. Big sting operation. The Newfoundland and Labrador Supreme Court of Appeal ultimately agreed and tossed out the confession, leaving the crown with the option to prove its case against Hart without using the videotaped confession obtained by the RCMP during its Mr. Big operation. The court also noted that Hart, who had been denied the chance to testify in his original trial due to his fears of speaking in public, should have been accommodated and allowed to testify in private due to his tendency towards epileptic seizures brought on by stress.

=== Fallout ===
NL Crown prosecutors appealed the NL Supreme Court decision to the Supreme Court of Canada, which would go on to agree with the lower court's ruling. The Hart decision from the Supreme Court of Canada shed light on the well-known and highly successful police tactic, "Mr. Big," which is designed to gain confessions in high profile criminal cases. The Supreme Court of Canada warned that the Mr. Big tactic has the potential to pose three significant and dangerous unintended outcomes, including the reliability of the confession itself, that could ultimately lead to a wrongful conviction; prejudice, in that the accused, by their active participation in what they believe is a criminal enterprise, unfairly prejudices the jury due to the accused being portrayed in a criminal light that is unrelated to the crime they are accused of committing; and the potential for police misconduct. The undercover police officer who led the investigation into Karen and Krista Hart's deaths was highly critical of the Supreme Court ruling, noting that he believed that Hart was guilty of murdering his daughters and stating that the decision will hurt future investigations into serious crime.

In July 2014, Crown prosecutors in Gander announced that they would not seek another murder trial for Hart. Supreme Court Justice David Peddle granted the Crown's request to withdraw murder charges against him due to insufficient evidence. Hart was released from Her Majesty's Penitentiary, St. John's, NL in July 2014, after serving nine years in prison.

== Prison incidents ==
While incarcerated, Hart faced additional criminal charges stemming from interactions with correctional officers. Hart faced four counts of uttering threats to correctional officers, a single charge of assaulting a correctional officer, and one count of mischief for damaging prison property due to an incident that occurred in June 2013. The matter went to trial in February 2015, after Hart had been released from prison. Hart claimed he wanted the matter before the courts so that people could see how he was treated in prison. Hart claimed that he became agitated by poor treatment from correctional officers and acted out due to being treated like a "dog." Video of the incident showed Hart being restrained by three correctional officers after using a kettle to smash a television that was located on the unit where he was being housed. After Hart was restrained, additional video shows ten correctional officers entering Hart's cell and physically forcing him to the floor, where he is restrained and pulled from the cell. Hart's mother, Pearl Hart, appeared on a Newfoundland and Labrador news program stating that her son was being treated cruelly while incarcerated. Hart was convicted of the threats and mischief charge and sentenced to a 60-day conditional sentence to be served in the community.

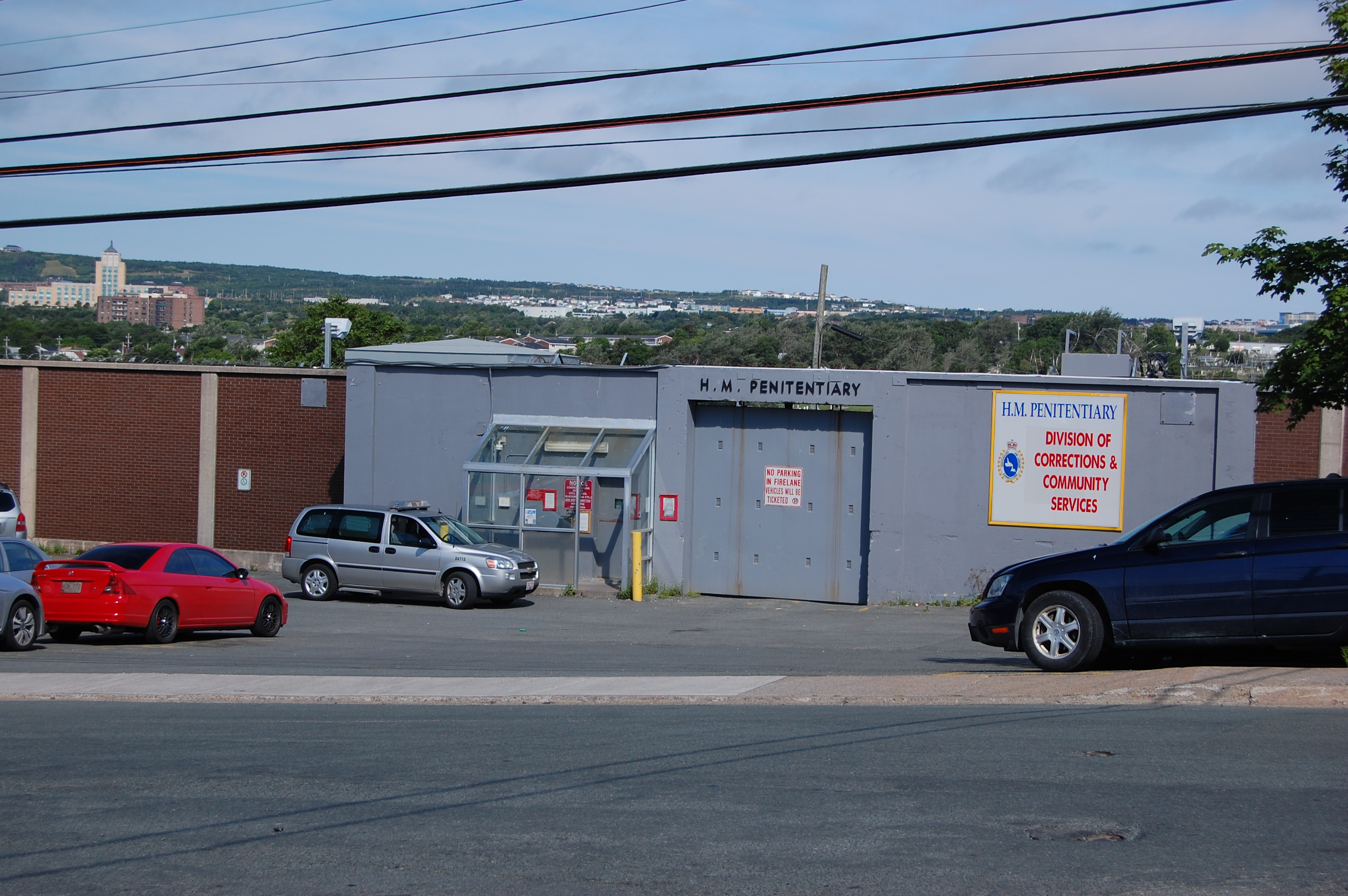
Her Majesty's Penitentiary, St. John's, NL

In another prison incident, Hart was charged in January 2013 for allegedly threatening and assaulting correctional officers with a paper plate. The Royal Newfoundland Constabulary charged Hart based on a single paragraph, unsigned report written by a correctional officer in relation to the incident. It was alleged by Hart's defense lawyer, Jeff Brace, that Constable Cody Dunphy had charged Hart without ever interviewing the correctional officers involved or viewing the available video of the incident. Hart's attorney argued that Hart was being poorly treated by correctional staff because of the notoriety of his murder case. Brace suggested that a particular correctional officer was "hell bent" on getting Hart on a charge, prompting him to sarcastically declare in open court, "We wouldn't want to be beaten up with a paper plate." The assault charge was later dismissed, and Hart was found guilty of threats to prison staff.
