= Royal Newfoundland Constabulary sexual abuse scandal =

Police scandal in Canada

The Royal Newfoundland Constabulary sexual abuse scandal occurred in 2014 and concerned allegations of assault by Constable Doug Snelgrove.

== Origins ==
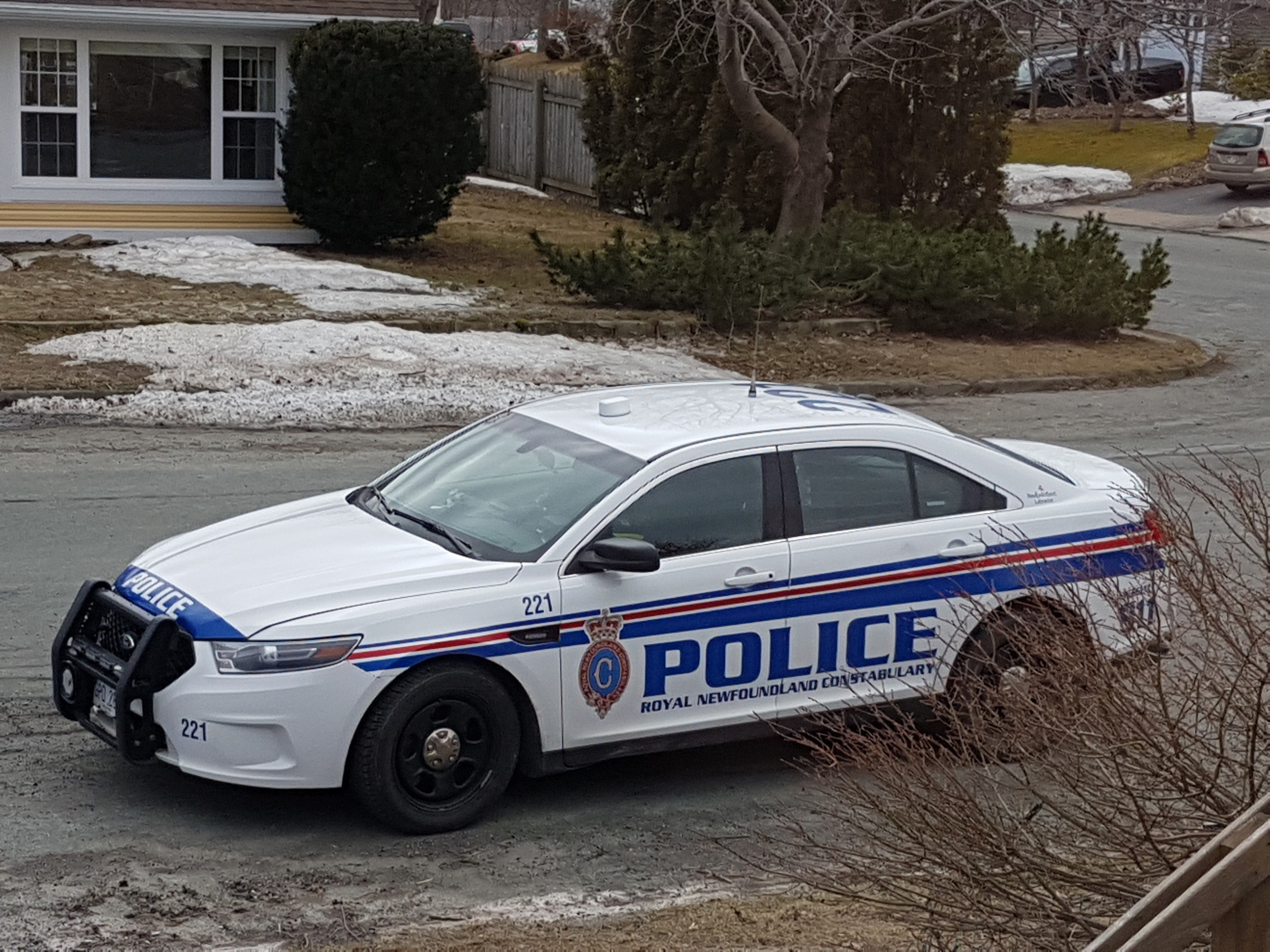
A Royal Newfoundland Constabulary patrol vehicle is pictured

On December 21, 2014, Royal Newfoundland Constabulary (RNC) Officer, Constable Doug Snelgrove, a ten-year veteran of the RNC, had given a Newfoundland and Labrador woman a ride home, while on duty and in his marked police cruiser. The woman later alleged that Snelgrove had sexually assaulted her in her residence.

In April 2015, the Ontario Provincial Police (OPP) were called in to investigative, and Snelgrove was charged in July 2015, with one count of sexual assault stemming from the complaint, setting the stage for three sexual assault trials, in St. John's, NL.

== Trial #1 ==
In February 2017, the sexual assault trial of RNC Constable Doug Snelgrove began in the Supreme Court of NL, with the Crown focusing its case on the issue of consent, claiming that the victim of the sexual assault was inebriated at the time of the assault and could not consent to sex. The court heard that a GPS tracker on the police cruiser being driven by Snelgrove on December 21, 2014, placed him at the victim's residence and a DNA sample found on the woman's loveseat was a match to Snelgrove.

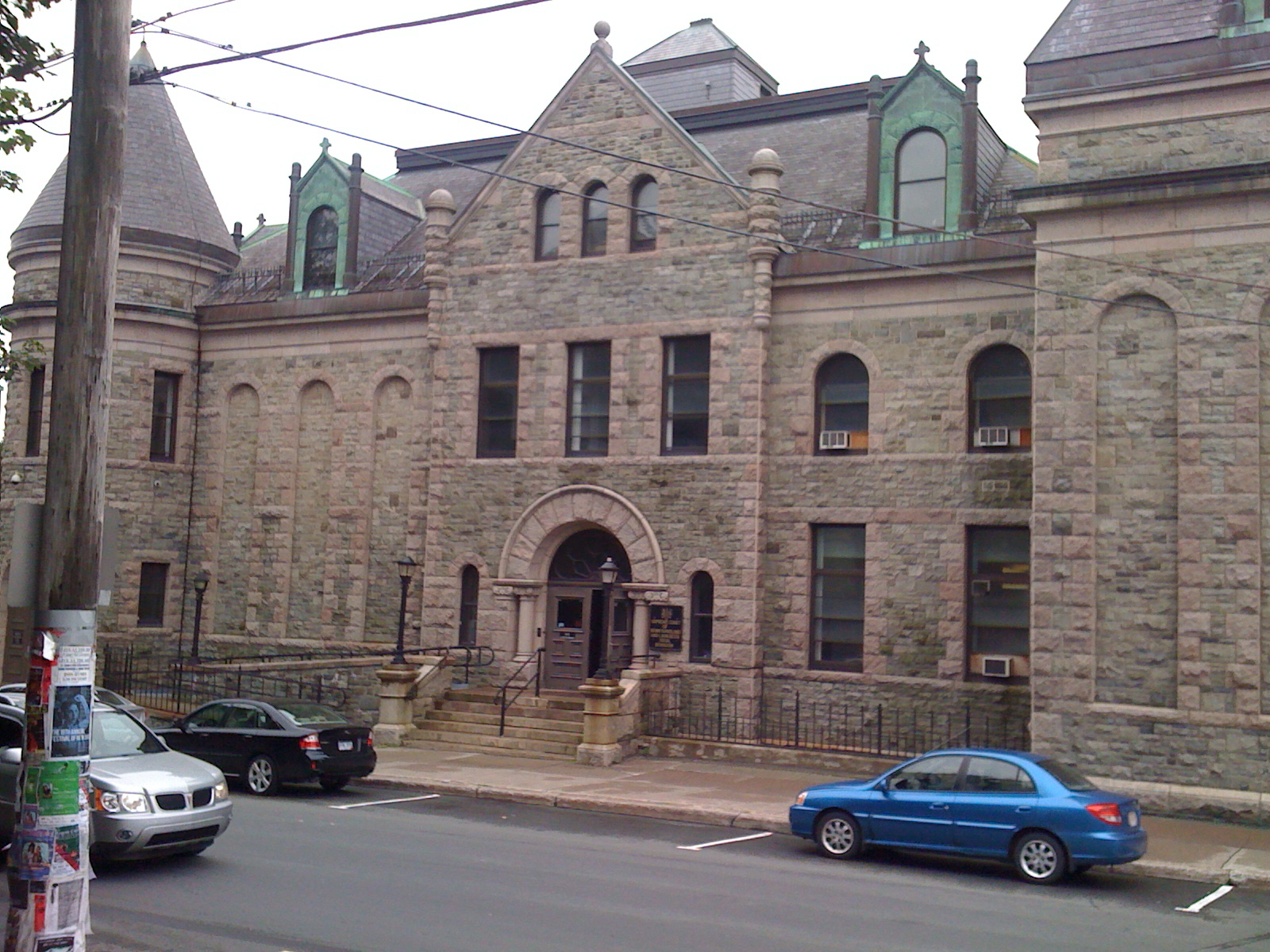
The Supreme Court of NL as seen from Duckworth Street, St. John's, NL

The victim, known only as 'Jane Doe,' testified that she had been at a nightclub in Downtown St. John's, when she asked a police officer for a ride home. She testified that once they reached her residence, she could not find her keys, and Snelgrove helped her in through a window, and she opened the door to the residence and allowed him inside. She testified that the next thing she could remember was having no clothes on while the police officer was having sex with her. She testified, she remembered kissing Snelgrove, but could not remember consenting to sexual intercourse, testifying that she did not want to have sex and was only interested in getting home and getting to sleep. The crown called four witnesses' who testified that the woman had been drinking in the hours leading up to the assault.

Snelgrove testified that the woman was not at all drunk and had consented to and initiated the sex. Snelgrove testified that after he had helped the woman get inside her apartment, she had kissed him, took off her clothes and began giving him oral sex. Snelgrove testified that he asked the woman what she liked, and she responded to him by saying, "Everything." Snelgrove then proceeded to have vaginal and anal sex with the woman.

While the crown focused on the issue of consent, Snelgrove's defense disagreed and argued that he was an 'idiot, who made a bad decision,' but he was not a criminal. His defense further focused on the testimony of a toxicology expert, who testified that the woman had an alcohol induced black out, which caused her inability to not remember particular details of the incident.

On February 23, 2017, the jury hearing the case against Snelgrove, went into deliberations, with instructions from the judge emphasizing that Snelgrove could only be found guilty if the crown had proved that he had used force that was sexual in nature and without her consent. After a day and a half of deliberations the jury returned a unanimous verdict of "Not Guilty," in the sexual assault trial of Constable Doug Snelgrove.

=== Aftermath ===
Immediately following the trial a protest broke out on the steps of NL's Supreme Court, challenging the verdict, with supporters of the victim holding signs that read, 'I believe her,' and 'Too drunk to consent.' The Chief of the Royal Newfoundland Constabulary insisted that Snelgrove would remain suspended from the force until any appeals were dealt with and the issue made its way through the RNC's Public Complaints Commission. On the day following the verdict, downtown St. John's was littered with graffiti revealing public outrage over the decision, with slogans spray painted on public property that read, 'Believe victims,' and 'St. John's cops support rape.' Other messages targeted the police in general, and threatened the life of Constable Snelgrove. Eggs were thrown at the windows of the NL Supreme Court building in Downtown St. John's. On the Monday following the verdict, a large crowd of protesters gathered at RNC headquarters holding various signs and chanting derogatory slogans directed at Snelgrove and the NL police in general. Newfoundland and Labrador's then Justice Minister, Andrew Parsons, made headlines when he sent out a tweet following the verdict, which was quickly criticized by the local legal community. Following the protest, Parson's appeared to criticize the RNC, calling for a show of leadership from the force. Meanwhile, the RNC as a whole were facing mounting public criticism for a series of incidents that had kept the force in NL's news headlines. During the timeframe of the Snelgrove verdict, the force was already involved in a public inquiry over the shooting death of Newfoundland man by the RNC, outside of RNC jurisdiction. An RNC constable was on trial for making lewd telephone calls to a female and attempting to blame a member of the public for his actions, and another constable was being investigated by the Ontario Provincial Police for his handling of that case. There were also five senior RNC members being investigated for their handling of a confidential source.

On March 8, 2017, NL's Crown prosecutor announced that the province was appealing the Snelgrove Verdict citing errors in the presiding judge's instruction's to the jury, stating that the jury should have been instructed that there could be no consent in which "the accused induces the complainant to engage in the [sexual] activity by abusing a position of trust, power or authority."

== Trial #2 ==
In September 2020, Constable Snelgrove was back in a NL courtroom, however, this trial was moved from the Supreme Court Building in downtown St. John's, to the former School for the Deaf on Topsail Road in St. John's west, to allow for physical distancing due to the COVID-19 pandemic that had swept the globe. For the second time since the alleged assault took place, Jane Doe, testified to the court that she could not recall if she did or didn't consent to sex. She testified that she remembered waking up with Snelgrove penetrating her anus. Doe, stated that she did not want to have sex with Snelgrove, but admitted to kissing him. She testified that she did not call the police after the assault, because she feared nobody would believe a drunk girl over a police officer. Snelgrove testified that all sexual acts between him and the complainant were consensual and initiated by the complainant. He stated that he didn't believe she was drunk, and only had a faint smell of alcohol on her breath. Snelgrove again testified that the woman had initiated sex by removing all her clothing, and performing oral sex on him. Again, witnesses were called to corroborate the woman's claim that she was intoxicated at the time Snelgrove had driven her home. On September 24, 2020, the jury was sequestered and began deliberations. On the following day, the presiding judge declared a mistrial in the Snelgrove sexual assault case, citing that two jurors were wrongfully dismissed, after hearing all the evidence. Jurors 13, and 14, were dismissed without being given a chance to deliberate. The judge noted that he erred in not using a lottery system to choose the 12 jurors who would ultimately deliberate, and instead, dismissed two alternate jurors improperly. The crown argued that it was just a technicality and the jury should have proceeded with deliberations, however the judge noted that the error could not be fixed as the jury was not properly constituted.

=== Aftermath ===
Following the sudden announcement of a mistrial, woman's rights advocates openly criticized the justice system in general, and stated that the Snelgrove trial was a good example of why so many women do not report sexual assault to authorities. Advocates stated that women and victims of sexual assault are traumatized repeatedly for reporting abuse, first by the assault itself and then by the justice system, by having to relive the ordeal over and over again. The mistrial sparked another protest on the steps on the Supreme Court Building in downtown St. John's, and the crown prosecutor expressed concerns that Jane Doe, may not want to participate in a third jury trial.

== Trial #3 ==
- In May 2021, RNC Constable Doug Snelgrove stood trial for one count of sexual assault for the third time in a NL courtroom, setting off a wave of criticism from various women's groups, and supporters of the complainant. Snelgrove testified for the third time that he did not believe the complainant was intoxicated, and repeated that all sexual acts were initiated by Jane Doe and consensual. Jane Doe meanwhile repeated her previous testimony, that she did not want to have sex with Snelgrove on the night in question, and does not remember consenting to sex. A jury was again sequestered, and on May 15, 2021, found Constable Snelgrove guilty of sexually assaulting the complainant.

=== Sentencing ===
- On November 12, 2021, six years following a NL woman's allegation that she was raped by an on-duty Royal Newfoundland Constabulary officer, Doug Snelgrove was sentenced to four years in prison. In sentencing a NL judge told the courtroom that he hoped the sentencing sends a message to people in position's of authority. Snelgrove was placed in the custody of His Majesty's Penitentiary, while various women's groups and advocates celebrated the decision. However, Snelgrove would be released from custody just weeks later, as he sought a fourth trial following an appeal of his sentence.
- Snelgrove was returned to prison in April 2023, after the NL Court of appeal upheld his conviction.
- In July 2023, Snelgrove was released from prison to await a decision on an appeal to the Supreme Court of Canada.

=== Aftermath ===
- During the third trial of RNC Constable Doug Snelgrove, several NL women came forward telling their personal stories of sexual assault and their fear of coming forward, citing the power dynamic between them and their abusers.
- Following the Snelgrove verdict, several NL women came forward to a well-known NL, attorney, Lynn Moore, (Morris Martin Moore) who specialized in sexual assaults, alleging that they too, had been victims of sexual assaults by RNC officers. The Canadian Broadcasting Corporation (CBC) cited sources with inside knowledge of the force, who described widespread sexual misconduct within the force from officers who habitually targeted civilians in St. John's. In response to the allegations NL's Justice Minister, John Hogan, announced a workplace review of the culture and governance of the RNC, but insisted the review was not in relation to officer misconduct, but rather an overall review of the workplace to look for ways to improve the force including looking at gaps in mental health services for officers.
- In July 2021, NL's Serious Incident Response Team (SIRT) revealed that it was investigating four NL police officer's for sexual offences.
- In May 2023, attorney Lynn Moore publicly stated that 7 RNC officers had been accused of sexual assault by nine NL women, including three women who alleged that they were propositioned for sex in patrol cars.
- In May 2022, a female RNC officer filed a civil against the Province of NL. alleging that she had been raped by a fellow police officer after being driven home.
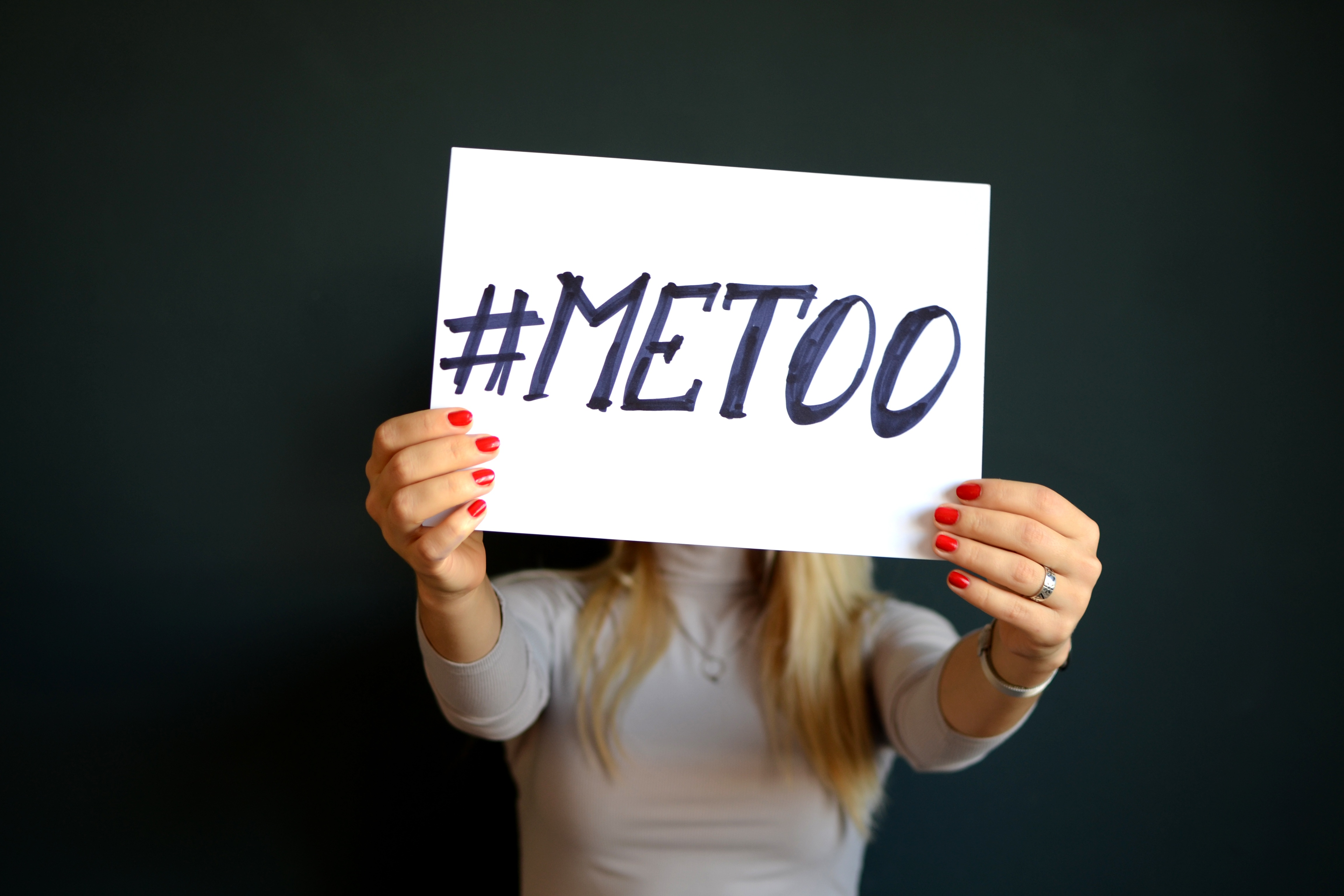
  The Snelgrove verdict set off a wave of sexual abuse and harassment allegations' against the RNC.
- In July 2022, a civilian led group concerned for the safety of NL women submitted a report that condemned the lack of oversight of police in NL, noting there was clearly a problem of trust and confidence in the NL police.
- In August 2022, a former spouse of an RNC officer came forward with her story of years of abuse from her former husband. The woman claimed that she suffered extensive rape, stalking and harassment from the RNC officer and had made seven complaints to the RNC, with no charges ever being laid against her assailant.
- In all, 11 women came forward to NL attorney Lynn Moore, with stories of sexual misconduct by RNC officers. Of the 11 women who did come forward, nine chose to file lawsuit(s) against the province of NL.
- In July 2022, the workplace review of the RNC was released, the report noted a myriad of issues including low morale within the force, favoritism and fear of retaliation and internal discipline. The report also confirmed a knowledge within the RNC that sexual abuse within the force was a known problem.
- In August, 2022, NL's Serious Incident Response Team (SIRT), revealed that during the timeframe in which the highly public Snelgrove saga was unfolding, another RNC officer was acting in a near exact way as Snelgrove, leading to several complaints from NL women. King noted that at least one of those complaints should have led to a criminal charge against the officer, however the officer was allowed to resign his post without charge. The SIRT report led Lynn Moore to refer to the complaints against that officer as a cover-up by the RNC.

== Historical sex/abuse/harassment related occurrence's involving members of the RNC ==
- In 1993, the Royal Newfoundland Constabulary initiated an undercover sting at the Village Mall in St. John's NL, when members of the public complained about men having sex in a public washroom at the facility. Police investigated by setting up hidden cameras within the common area of the bathroom, that subsequently revealed upwards of sixty men engaging in consensual homosexual acts. Of the sixty men observed on camera 36 were identified and charged with disorderly conduct. One of those men charged was a member of the RNC, who resigned his position. The fallout of the case had a negative effect on the community as the majority of the men were in heterosexual marriages/relationships, had children and gainful employment. Names of the accused were published in 'The Evening Telegram,' causing great embarrassment to the individuals involved and their family's. Jobs were lost, families were humiliated, and rumors abound that the reporting of the names in the local paper lead to at least one suicide. At the time, 'The Evening Telegram', and RNC, were highly criticized regarding the handling of the case. In 2018, members of the LBGTQ community asked for the RNC to apologize, citing the entire operation was an affront against the gay community and not a criminal matter. The RNC refused to apologize for their actions taken, while the Telegram did acknowledge that they should have handled the situation in a more discreet fashion.
- Later in 1993, four RNC officer's were suspended from the force when a complaint was made by a citizen of St. John's. The man alleged that he was targeted by RNC officers because he was gay. The man was detained outside a St. John's night club known to be frequented by gay men. The man was detained and held at the St. John's City Lock-up, and derogatory language was used by at least one of the officer's during his detainment.
- In 2008, a high ranking RNC officer was charged with sexual assault against a female officer, after an investigation by the OPP. The officer originally pleaded not guilty to the charge, but later changed his plea to guilty and resigned from the force. The police officer was sentenced to a period of probation and given a conditional discharge.
- In 2010, an RNC officer was charged and pleaded guilty to making 77 harassing telephone calls to a NL woman, within a two-week period. The RNC officer's sentencing was postponed until after he was provided with the opportunity to retire from the force.
- In 2015, an RNC officer was sentenced to four months in prison for making sexually lewd telephone calls to a NL woman. The Case itself took another turn when the officer attempted to blame another individual for making the calls, and was subsequently sentenced to an additional six months for mischief. That case would lead to several other internal investigations against another RNC officer, who reportedly warned his colleague that he was under investigation. That officer was cleared of wrongdoing, but was subjected to a number of investigations, which received several years of media coverage, causing that officer to threaten a lawsuit of his own for being maliciously prosecuted.
- In 2017 a long serving member of the RNC filed a lawsuit against the force and NL Department of Justice, claiming that senior management at the RNC had bullied, harassed, and placed him under unfounded internal investigations that crippled his career as a police officer.
- In 2017, a 33-year member of the RNC claimed he was forced to retire after becoming embroiled in an internal investigation. The officer filed a lawsuit against the force for negligence, however his claim was shot down by a NL judge.
- In 2022 an RNC officer was charged with assault and assault causing bodily harm, when she allegedly beat and choked her intimate partner over a two-year period. The officer was removed from active duty, and placed in an administrative role, while she awaited trial. During that time period, The Royal Newfoundland Constabulary would once again come under heavy criticism, when the force presented the charged officer with a distinguished commendation award. The officer was later convicted of the crimes and sentenced to four months in prison. The officer was granted bail pending and appeal, following three days in a NL jail.
- In 2023, RNC officer Doug Snelgrove's appeal to the NL Supreme Court was denied, and Snelgrove was returned to the custody of Her Majesty's Penitentiary.
- Following the dismissal of the Snelgrove appeal, CBC news reported that the victim, "Jane Doe," had reached out to attorney Lynn Moore to offer her thanks, and thank her many supporters during her three trials and eight- year ordeal. Moore in turn thanked Jane Doe, for helping to make the NL community a safer place. The dismissal prompted calls from various groups appealing to the Royal Newfoundland Constabulary to acknowledge that there is deep rooted cultural problem within the force, and an apology to the people of NL was needed.
- In 2022, the CBC in Nova Scotia, New Brunswick and NL embarked on an investigative series in relation to police accountability, filing court challenges in various province's in an attempt to gain assess to internal disciplinary records of various policing agencies. In NL, an access to information request revealed hundreds of complaints against RNC officers ranging from failing to complete their duties to sexual assault over a ten-year period. The records indicated at least eight sex related complaints against eight RNC officers since 2015, and forty harassment complaints since 2010.

== Historical sex abuse cover-up ==
- On December 9, 1975, the Royal Newfoundland Constabulary opened an investigation into sexual and physical abuse at the Mount Cashel Orphanage for Boys in St. John's NL, after repeated complaints from care givers, such as doctors, social workers and the resident boys themselves. RNC officers interviewed 24 boys at the time of the allegations, and learned that almost all the boys living at the facility had reported being sexually and/or physical abused. On December 17, RNC officers interviewed two Christian Brothers from the facility, who admitted to sexually molesting boys at the orphanage. The following day, the then Chief of the Royal Newfoundland Constabulary ordered the investigation closed and instructed his officers to scrub the report and eliminate any reference to sexual abuse. The two Christian Brothers who admitted to the sexual molestation of minor children where then sent to the United States for "treatment."

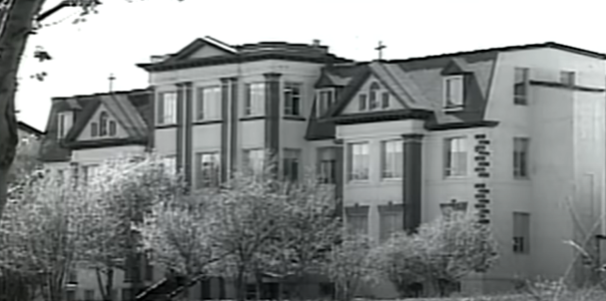
The Notorious Mount Cashel Orphanage was located in St. John's NL, before being demolished. The orphanage was known to police for the sexual and physical abuse of young NL boys.

- On April 10, 1979, an RNC police officer is testifying at a commission unrelated to Mount Cashel Orphanage. During questioning, the officer states that the Royal Newfoundland Constabulary has been involved in multiple cover-ups, and cites sexual crimes at Mount Cashel Orphanage as an example. That officer is later demoted and has his salary clawed back.
- On February 3, 1989, a caller to a NL talk radio show, calls into VOCM Open Line and tells the listening Newfoundland and Labrador public that sexual abuse at Mount Cashel Orphanage has been covered-up by The Royal Newfoundland Constabulary and NL Justice officials.
- On March 19, 1989, then twenty-one-year-old Shane Earle, a boy who had been previously beaten and sexually abused at the orphanage, and who had originally reported that abuse to NL police in 1975, goes public by telling the story of the abuse he suffered at the hands of Christian Brothers at Mount Cashel Orphanage to Michael Harris, a well-known Canadian investigative journalist, who publishes Earle's story in the now defunct Sunday Express Newspaper.
- Earle's expose leads to a new investigation by the Royal Newfoundland Constabulary in which nine Christian Brothers are charged and prosecuted for various criminal offences including sex offences against the boys of Mount Cashel orphanage.
- Shane Earle would go on to appear on the Oprah Winfrey Show, where his story is told to an American audience. The sexual abuse at Mount Cashel Orphanage would create a domino effect worldwide throughout the Catholic Church, in which sexual abuse was confirmed to be widespread and rampant within the global Catholic Church system.
- On September 25, 2009, the former Roman Catholic Bishop of Antigonish, Nova Scotia, was charged with importing child pornography into Canada. Raymond Lahey, a NL born priest, was entering Canada via the Ottawa International Airport, when his laptop was seized by Canadian Border Services during a routine inspection. The arrest sparked anger in NL, and two former residents of the Mount Cashel Orphanage came forward claiming that the Royal Newfoundland Constabulary had been informed that Lahey was in possession of child pornography twenty years previously in NL. Shane Earle, the young boy who was beaten and reported being sexually abused at Mount Cashel Orphanage, told the Canadian Broadcasting Corporation (CBC) he had testified about it during the Hughes inquiry. Earle was subsequently contacted by the RNC, who informed him that they were investigating the claim that Lahey had previously been in possession of child pornography in NL. The provincial police force stated they were reviewing audio and video records of interviews with victims and offenders from their investigation of sex abuse at the Mount Cashel orphanage, but were unable to find any evidence to support the allegations that Lahey had been in possession of child pornography in 1980's NL. However, several days later, on October 5, Church officials in NL, acknowledged that they themselves were made aware of child pornography allegations against Lahey in 1989.
- In 2023, more than sixty British Columbia men came forward with allegations of sexual and physical abuse against Christian Brothers in Vancouver, British Columbia. The CBC reported that former Christian Brother Joseph Burke, who was originally charged with abuse in NL, was able to continue teaching and have access to minor children in British Columbia, after teaching at the Mount Cashel Orphanage.
- In 2023, an investigation from Illinois, US, revealed that former Christian Brother Ronald Lasik, who was convicted of abusing boys from Mount Cashel Orphanage, was accused of abuse in Chicago, Illinois in the late 1960s, and again accused of abuse while working in Australia, in the 1970s.
