= Mr. Big (2007 film) =

- Directed by: Tiffany Burns
- Written by: Tiffany Burns
- Produced by: Tiffany Burns
- Starring: Glen Sebastian Burns; Tiffany Burns; Atif Rafay
- Edited by: Alec MacNeill Richardson
- Music by: Jeff Tymoschuk
- Production company: Eagle Harbour Entertainment
- Release date: October 1, 2007 (Vancouver International Film Festival)
- Running time: 89 minutes
- Country: Canada
- Language: English

Mr. Big is a 2007 documentary directed and produced by Tiffany Burns and edited by Alec MacNeill Richardson. The documentary examines the "Mr. Big" undercover methods used by the Royal Canadian Mounted Police (RCMP). In these operations, RCMP officers pose as high-ranking gang criminals and develop relationships with the target involved. This is deliberate, as the relationship that is forged is ultimately used to determine what knowledge the target has of the crime(s) being investigated. "Mr. Big" operations have been credited with securing difficult convictions in a large number of cases, such as United States v. Burns, R v. Hart, and R v. Grandinetti, but concerns have been raised that they involve a risk of false confessions and wrongful convictions. Mr. Big includes interviews with targets of "Mr. Big" operations and their families, such as the Burns family, as well as interviews with various professionals who have an interest in the "Mr. Big" tactics, and RCMP footage of "Mr. Big" operations.

== Cast ==
- Glen Sebastian Burns as himself
- Tiffany Burns as herself
- Donna Larsen as herself
- Atif Rafay as himself
