= Little Harbour (Gander Lake) =

Park in Newfoundland and Labrador, Canada

Coordinates: 48°56′37.78″N 54°43′31.60″W

Little Harbour is a small unattended recreation area situated on Gander Lake, near Gander, Newfoundland. Access to this area is via a 1.5 kilometre gravel road from Route 1 (the Trans-Canada Highway).

Little Harbour is a recreational park used by residents of Gander for boating and picnicking. A slipway for launching small pleasure craft is available for use by the public.

East of the cove that makes up Little Harbour is an area where ultramafic rocks created during faulting during the Ordovician time which has been exposed by erosion over time.

Little Harbour was the scene of a tragic incident in 2002 when twin sisters, daughters of Nelson Hart, Karen and Krista Hart were drowned.
