= Mr. Big (police procedure) =

Covert investigation strategy

Mr. Big (sometimes known as the Canadian technique) is a covert investigation procedure used by undercover police to elicit confessions from suspects in cold cases (usually murder). Police officers create a fictitious grey area or criminal organization and then seduce the suspect into joining it. They build a relationship with the suspect, gain their confidence, and then enlist their help in a succession of criminal acts (e.g., delivering goods, credit card scams, selling guns) for which they are paid. Once the suspect has become enmeshed in the criminal gang, they are persuaded to divulge information about their criminal history, usually as a prerequisite for being accepted as a member of the organization.

The Mr. Big technique was developed by the Royal Canadian Mounted Police (RCMP), with the first documented case taking place in British Columbia in March of 1965, during the investigation of David Louis Harrison, a former Vancouver police constable who was tried and convicted for taking part in the robbery of $1.2 million of cancelled currency from the Canadian Pacific Merchandise Services warehouse in Vancouver. Harrison was convicted using evidence gained by Cpl. Allan Richards, posing as crime syndicate hoodlum John Clarke, and his sting partner, police operative Al Brooks. Harrison testified that he believed John Clarke was a violent syndicate hoodlum. Harrison further testified that Clarke was often packing a gun, that Clarke carried a vial of nitroglycerine around his neck that he would throw at a police car if it got too close to him, and that he was afraid he would be harmed if he didn’t play along.

The Mr. Big tactic has been used in more than 350 cases across Canada as of 2008. The RCMP claims that the person of interest was either cleared or charged in 75% of cases (the rest remaining unresolved and requiring further investigation). Of the cases prosecuted, an estimated 95% result in a conviction.

The use of this technique is essentially prohibited in some countries, including the United Kingdom and the United States. In Germany, which has high standards for what constitutes a voluntary confession, it may be more difficult to use confessions obtained by this technique. The procedure has been used by police in Australia and New Zealand, and its use has been upheld by courts in both countries.

== Description ==
In a Mr. Big case, the police usually place the suspect under extended surveillance, typically for weeks. Having thus learned about the suspect's personality and habits, the police develop an interactive scenario. Pretending to encounter the suspect by happenstance, an undercover operative solicits a small favor from the suspect, such as fixing a flat tire. Exploiting this acquaintanceship, the operative soon offers entertainment, gifts, companionship, meals, and eventually employment.

The undercover operative pays the suspect appreciable money for petty tasks, such as counting cash or making deliveries, associated with fictitious criminal activity. As these tasks grow in importance and frequency, the suspect is treated as an "up-and-comer" in a criminal organization. As many as 50 operatives may be involved, crafting "a steady escalation in association, influence and pressure, leading up to the creation of an atmosphere in which it is deemed appropriate to encourage the target to confess". Eventually, the suspect is introduced to Mr. Big, the fictitious crime organization's kingpin, who is actually a skilled police interrogator.

Employing enticements and threats, Mr. Big tells the suspect of receiving incriminating information about the suspect from the police, whose impending arrest threatens the gang, to explain why Mr. Big must know the unsolved crime's details. Mr. Big may offer to clean up the situation by framing someone else, or Mr. Big might claim that a mole within the police department can tamper with incriminating evidence. Sometimes, the confession is demanded to show good faith, loyalty, or trustworthiness or serve as "insurance" to Mr. Big. The final meeting is usually recorded.

Once the police either obtain a confession or become convinced of the suspect's innocence, the lavish lifestyle and elaborate underworld evaporate, and (where a confession has been obtained) the suspect is arrested. The Mr. Big technique is often a last resort in cold cases, or where the police's strong suspicion is paired with insufficient evidence. The Mr. Big technique has been used to secure convictions in hundreds of cases and has been highly effective in obtaining confessions from suspects. Still, the technique also gives some innocent suspects compelling motivation to remain in the criminal organization; to maintain the new lifestyle and new friends, falsely confessing to Mr. Big may then seem an acceptable risk.

== Legal history ==
=== The Andy Rose case ===
In October 1983, Andrea Scherpf and Bernd Göricke were murdered in Chetwynd, British Columbia. In 1991, Andy Rose was convicted of these killings, relying almost exclusively on testimony from a woman who claimed she saw him the night of the murder "drunk and covered in blood... claiming to have killed two people". Rose was sentenced to a minimum of 15 years in prison. The conviction was overturned on a technicality in 1992, but a new trial was ordered immediately, and Rose remained in prison. In 1994, Rose was again sentenced to a minimum of 15 years in prison, again almost exclusively on testimony from the woman who claimed to see him in Chetwynd, and his next appeal was denied in 1996. Rose was released on bail in 1997, when his second conviction was overturned on a technicality.

Mounting evidence against a possible third conviction complicated the developments for the Crown attorney's refiling, including the witness against Rose being off on her timing by at least two weeks and a man in California took his own life after confessing to his wife – with numerous consistent details – to murdering two people near Chetwynd in October 1983.

In January 1999, an undercover operative of the RCMP contacted Rose to gain his trust in hopes of obtaining a confession through a Mr. Big operation. In the next eight months, the investigator befriended Rose. Rose was seduced into illegal activities, for which he received about $5,900 (equivalent to $10,400 in 2025). After eight months, the "gang" told him that they could gather information about his upcoming case and change the evidence for him so he would not have to go back to prison, or even to court. However, this support would only be granted if he became a recognized gang member, and it would be important to impress Mr. Big. At the meeting with Mr. Big in July 1999, Rose repeatedly reaffirmed his innocence. Then Mr. Big made it clear to him that he wanted to hear a confession and that Rose, known for his alcohol abuse, should consider this with a beer. After a few beers, Rose confessed. Based on this confession, the Crown filed for a third trial.

The third trial collapsed in 2001, and the proceedings against Rose were stayed, with the ability for the Crown to refile charges to a court. Rose's innocence was proven due to lack of DNA evidence and he was acquitted.

=== The Oreste Fulminante case ===
A confession obtained through a Mr. Big sting was declared inadmissible in the 1991 United States case of Arizona v. Fulminante. Oreste Fulminante was suspected of murdering his 11-year-old stepdaughter Jeneane Hunt in 1982 but was not charged with the crime. The following year Fulminante was serving time in prison for an unrelated crime when he was approached by undercover police agent Anthony Sarivola, who told him that there was a rumour going around the prison that he had killed a little girl. Sarivola warned Fulminante that he was in danger of "rough treatment" from other inmates because of the crime, then told him he had connections in organized crime and offered to protect him if he confessed. Fulminante agreed, confessing to Sarivola that he murdered his stepdaughter; he admitted to driving her out to the desert on his motorcycle, sexually assaulting her, choking her, making her plead for her life, and shooting her with his .357 revolver.

Fulminante argued at trial that his confession was coerced because he had feared that he would be subject to physical harm if he was not afforded protection by Sarivola. He was convicted and sentenced to death. The Arizona Supreme Court denied an appeal against his conviction in 1988, finding that although his confession was coerced, other evidence against him rendered it harmless error. Fulminante then appealed to the Supreme Court of the United States in 1991. The court found that Fulminante's confession was indeed coerced, as he had faced a credible threat of physical violence if he did not confess, and that the confession was too important to the prosecution's case to be considered harmless error. The court therefore overturned Fulminante's conviction and ordered a new trial without the confession included in evidence.

=== The Rafay–Burns case ===
Canadians Atif Rafay and Sebastian Burns were sentenced to life for the 1994 murders, in Bellevue, Washington, United States, of Rafay's father, mother and sister, despite the lack of physical evidence and the presence of multiple alibis, on the basis of a Mr. Big confession. Rafay and Burns are supported by multiple miscarriage of justice advocates and as of 2016 had been appealing their case for over a decade. The Netflix documentary series The Confession Tapes covers the Rafay–Burns case in the first two episodes.

=== The Nelson Hart case ===
The flaws of the Mr. Big procedure came to light during the R. v Hart case. Nelson Hart, of Newfoundland, Canada, was charged in June 2005 with the deaths of his 2-year-old twin daughters who died as a result of drowning on Sunday, August 4, 2002. Hart claimed that he had taken the girls, Krista and Karen, to Little Harbour where there was a small wharf. Krista fell off the wharf, and Hart (who could not swim) panicked and left to get help, leaving the other child. In a later interview, Hart claimed that he had had a small seizure at the time that Krista fell into the water. Karen ostensibly fell in the water during Hart's absence. He drove home and returned with his wife. Krista was found alive but died at the hospital, and Karen was pronounced dead at the scene.

The Mr. Big operation began in October 2002. Preliminary surveillance revealed that Hart was socially isolated, had few friends and went everywhere with his wife. He was also on social insurance with only a grade four education, and had a history of seizures, which became more frequent after a car crash in 1998. The first contact took place when he was paid for assisting in finding an operative's sister. He was then asked to make some truck deliveries for which he was well paid. A friendship with his operatives developed. He began dealing in fake credit cards, forged passports, and counterfeit casino chips. Hart was made to believe that the gang was nationwide, with branches in Vancouver, Montreal and Halifax. As time went on, the seriousness of the illegal activities increased, along with the lucrativeness of the payoffs. He and his wife were treated to luxurious trips around the country, extravagant shopping sprees and expensive dinners. Hart aspired to join the gang as a full-time member.

In the late spring of 2003, he was introduced to the "boss" (Mr. Big) who told Hart that something had come up from Hart's past that the criminal organization needed to take care of. Mr. Big confronted Hart about the death of his daughters, and would not accept his seizure explanation. Under pressure, Hart confessed to pushing the girls off the wharf. Hart then brought Mr. Big and some operatives to the scene of the crime, to re-enact the drownings. This event was videotaped and served as the primary foundation of the prosecution's case at trial. In March 2007, a jury convicted him of two counts of first-degree murder.

Hart appealed his conviction. In 2012, in a 2–1 split decision the Court of Appeal allowed the appeal and ordered a new trial. According to Chief Justice Green, Hart

was in the control of the state in a manner that was equivalent in degree to detention. It was not reasonable to expect that he would have any reason, or take any opportunity, to leave the organization. That meant he had to subscribe to the culture of the organization and to ensure that he continued to receive the approbation of Mr. Big. Although he obviously wanted to maintain that he had an innocent explanation for the deaths of his daughters, he eventually succumbed when it became clear that Mr. Big would accept no other answer than one which accepted his proposition that he was responsible for their murder. For Mr. Hart in the circumstances in which he found himself there was very little downside to telling Mr. Big what he wanted to hear, since he believed the operatives were not police and he had been assured that any information he gave would be kept from the authorities. On the other hand, in his mind, Mr. Hart had a great deal to lose if he did not accede to the required admission.

The appeal court perceived Hart's section 7 Charter protections to have been breached.

The Crown appealed this decision to the Supreme Court of Canada, whose decision was released on July 31, 2014. Writing for a unanimous majority, Justice Moldaver declared that confessions arising from Mr. Big operations would henceforth be considered "presumptively inadmissible, subject to a two-pronged admissibility analysis". The court ruled that the onus is on the Crown to overcome this presumption by demonstrating that the probative value of the evidence resulting from a Mr. Big operation, including the confession, outweighs its prejudicial effect (prong 1). Confirmatory evidence would constitute a "powerful guarantee of reliability". In other words, evidence found during a Mr. Big operation would be a vital factor on the issue of reliability, and not the confession per se. The confession itself should be considered carefully to evaluate the markers of reliability. Markers of reliability include components of the confession that coincide with evidence that is known to investigators, information that is unknown to the public, and mundane details that would only be known to the person who had committed the crime. In future operations this evidentiary requirement might shift the goal from getting a confession to unearthing conclusive evidence. The Supreme Court also alerted trial judges to the possible dangers of abuse of process which might take place during Mr. Big stings, and of the need for careful scrutiny during the trials (prong 2). An abuse of process has occurred when police "overcome the will of the accused and coerce a confession", as was said to have taken place in R. v. Hart. Overwhelming inducements, veiled threats of violence, and intimidation are examples of conduct that could be considered an abuse of process by the police.

=== The Dax Mack case ===
Following the landmark ruling of R. v. Hart the Supreme Court of Canada issued another Mr. Big ruling on September 26, 2014. Dax Mack was suspected of murdering his roommate, who at the time was considered a missing person. A friend of Mack's came forward to the police with claims that Mack had confessed to him about murdering his roommate. With this information, the police began a four-month Mr. Big operation which resulted in two confessions to undercover officers. Mack described shooting the victim and burning his body. During the Mr. Big operation, Mack participated in roughly 30 crime scenarios, none of which included high levels of violence and he was paid approximately $5,000 for his work. Eventually, the operation led undercover officers to a fire pit in a wooded area that belonged to Mack's father. The search resulted in the discovery of the victim's burned remains, as well as shot gun casings which matched a gun that was confiscated from the defendant's apartment. Mack was tried and found guilty of first degree murder by a jury.

Using the two-pronged analysis from the Hart (2014) ruling, the Supreme Court dismissed Mack's appeal in another unanimous decision. They concluded that the probative value of the confession, which was supported by discovery of new evidence, outweighed any prejudicial effect. The Court also found no abuse of process in the conduct of the undercover officers involved in the investigation.

=== The Kelly case ===
The Court of Appeal for Ontario found in R. v. Kelly that the presumption of inadmissibility established in R. v. Hart was applicable even in circumstances without the hallmarks of a usual Mr. Big operation. The court found that the promise of a large payout from an insurance fraud scheme had the same potential for the same dangers as traditional Mr. Big cases set out in Hart.

=== The Tawera Wichman case ===
The Supreme Court of New Zealand first ruled on the admissibility of "Mr. Big" confessions in the case of Tawera Wichman, then on trial for manslaughter in the 2009 death of his infant daughter. Wichman's five-month-old daughter Teegan, referred to in court filings as "T", died on 8 September 2009, having been hospitalized since 4 March after suffering massive internal haemorrhaging and fractured ribs and femora. Wichman stated that she had initially collapsed after suffering a choking fit, and admitted to having shaken her in an attempt to resuscitate her. Police suspected her injuries had actually been caused by Wichman violently shaking her after becoming frustrated with her constant crying. However, it was decided that insufficient evidence existed to prosecute Wichman, at which point, a Mr. Big operation was initiated in December 2012 to gather evidence against Wichman.

Two undercover police officers, "Ben" and "Scott", approached Wichman and pretended to recruit him to do various jobs for a fictitious criminal organization. Wichman was paid a total of $2,600 for his supposed work for this organization, which included burglaries and the selling of stolen goods and drugs, until 2 May 2013, when he was told that there would be an inquest into Teegan's death to ensure it would be at the forefront of his mind; an intercepted phone conversation between Wichman and his mother on this day showed that Wichman was afraid the inquest would result in him being charged with Teegan's death. Later that day, Wichman was contacted by Scott, who told him that he knew of his problems with the law and could leverage his contacts in the police to fix the problem for him if he told him what really happened. Wichman initially denied hurting Teegan, but Scott showed him Teegan's medical report which he had supposedly obtained from a corrupt police officer, which stated that Teegan appeared to have suffered injuries prior to her collapse on 4 March 2009. Wichman then confessed that he had shaken Teegan on 4 March and at least once a few days before that because she would not stop crying. He appeared to start crying at this point and thanked Scott for giving him the opportunity to confide about what really happened.

Wichman was charged with Teegan's manslaughter and immediately argued that his confession was inadmissible because he was under pressure to confess. He claimed that everything he told Scott was a "complete act" and he had told him what he wanted to hear because he feared that Scott would not help him or allow him to stay in the organization if he did not believe he was being honest with him. An initial appeal to the high court held that Wichman's confession was admissible, but the court of appeal subsequently ruled that it had been obtained improperly and should be excluded. The crown then appealed to the Supreme Court, which ruled on the matter in 2015. In a split 3–2 decision, the court ruled that Wichman's confession was not obtained improperly and was admissible as evidence, as the police had not forced, threatened, or intimidated Wichman to confess. The trial then proceeded with the confession admitted and ended in Wichman being jailed for three years on 21 July 2016.

=== The Kamal Reddy case ===
On 22 June 2016, Kamal Reddy was convicted of the 2006 murders of his former girlfriend Pakeeza Faizal and her daughter Juwairiyah Kalim using evidence that the New Zealand Police had obtained from a Mr. Big operation. Undercover Police officers posed as members of a criminal organisation who befriended and recruited Reddy into their circle. In 2014, Reddy subsequently confessed to the double murders to an undercover Police officer, who secretly filmed it. Reddy even took the undercover officer to the site under the motor overhead bridge in Auckland's North Shore where the bodies were buried.

While the Police and Crown wanted to suppress details of the undercover operation for efficacy purposes, Radio New Zealand and other New Zealand media successfully argued in Court that trials and police operations were a matter of public knowledge. Reddy's case marked the second time that a Mr. Big operation had gone before a jury and the first time that the NZ media was able to report it in full.

=== David Lyttle case ===
In 2014, the New Zealand Police launched a Mr Big operation during a murder investigation into the disappearance and death of Brett Hall in May 2011. Prior to the 2014 Mr Big operation, the Police had bugged Lyttle's house and phone calls in 2011, which yielded information about his profile, personality, hobbies, financial situation and vulnerabilities. Posing as members of a criminal organisation, undercover police officers befriended murder suspect David Lyttle. Lyttle subsequently confessed to murdering Hall and showed an undercover police officer where he had supposedly buried Hall's remains; however, no remains were found when police excavated the site. In November 2019, Lyttle was convicted by a Wellington High Court jury of murdering Hall. While the Crown defended the efficacy of the Police's Mr Big operation in securing Lyttle's conviction, the defence argued that his confession was just a story. Lyttle was subsequently sentenced to life imprisonment with a minimum non parole period of 11 years.

Lyttle's defence team appealed against his murder conviction to the New Zealand Court of Appeal, arguing that evidence acquired during the Mr Big sting was unreliable and should not have been used. The Court of Appeal agreed with the defence submission and the defence team successfully argued in court that there was insufficient evidence to convict Lyttle. In December 2021, High Court Judge Simon France dismissed Lyttle's murder conviction on the grounds that "the jury could not reasonably convict Mr Lyttle on the available evidence." He also ruled that Lyttle could not be retried. In March 2022, the Court of Appeal criticised senior police officers involved in the Lyttle case for failing to disclose information per the requirements of the Criminal Disclosure Act and not seeking legal advice during the investigation.

In early August 2022, the Supreme Court of New Zealand rejected a bid by Lyttle to get the Crown prosecutor to pay half of his legal costs. The Supreme Court also criticised the prosecution's delays in bringing the case to trial, which was attributed to Police failure to comply with their disclosure obligations.

=== William James Fulton case ===
In the early hours of 5th June 1999, at a house on the Corcrain estate of Portadown in Northern Ireland, a 59 year old Protestant civilian named Elizabeth O'Neill (who had married a Catholic) was killed instantly after a pipe bomb, that was thrown through her living room window by suspected loyalist paramilitaries, detonated as she picked it up off the floor. The prime suspect in the case, William James Fulton, who was a senior member of the Portadown-based Loyalist Volunteer Force, later moved to Plymouth in south-west England, where he soon started working as a driver (on a weekly salary of £455) for a group of what he believed to be local criminals involved in the theft of lorries.

They were, in fact, undercover Devon and Cornwall Police officers, who were covertly recording every interaction they had with Fulton. As they gained his trust, he soon started boasting about his involvement in a vast array of terrorist activities (including the murder of Elizabeth O'Neill), with tens of thousands of hours worth of audio recordings ultimately being secured as evidence. Fulton would later try to dismiss the recordings as him repeating stories he heard from other people involved with loyalist paramilitaries, in the hope he would be promoted within the criminal gang on the strength of his previous experience conducting criminal activities in Northern Ireland.

In 2006, after being tried on evidence recovered from the covert recordings, Fulton was found guilty of 48 separate terrorist offences and was thereafter was sentenced to a life in prison, with a minimum term of 28 years before he could be considered for release. The crimes he was convicted of included:

- aiding and abetting the murder of Elizabeth O'Neill
- the attempted murder of three other civilians during two separate attacks on the same night O'Neill was killed
- the attempted murder of four police officers after he threw a blast bomb at them during the Drumcree conflict in July 1998
- the attempted tiger kidnapping of a bank manager in October 1999
- the kneecapping of 3 men during a punishment attack in Banbridge in January 1997
- possession of the gun used in the murder of Catholic taxi driver Michael McGoldrick
- destroying evidence in relation to the murder of Catholic council worker Adrian Lamph
- conspiracy to murder regarding his involvement in the attempted bombing of the Newry offices of Sinn Féin in May 1994
- directing terrorism (while acting as head of the L.V.F.) from June 1997 to September 1999
- the importation and supply of cannabis, estimated at 50 kilograms a week, over a two-year period
- membership of an illegal paramilitary organization (the L.V.F.)

== See also ==
- Entrapment
- Mr. Big, 2007 documentary film
- Sting operation
- Brett Peter Cowan
