= Royal Newfoundland Constabulary =

Canadian provincial police service

- Badge of the RNC

- Shoulder flash of the RNC

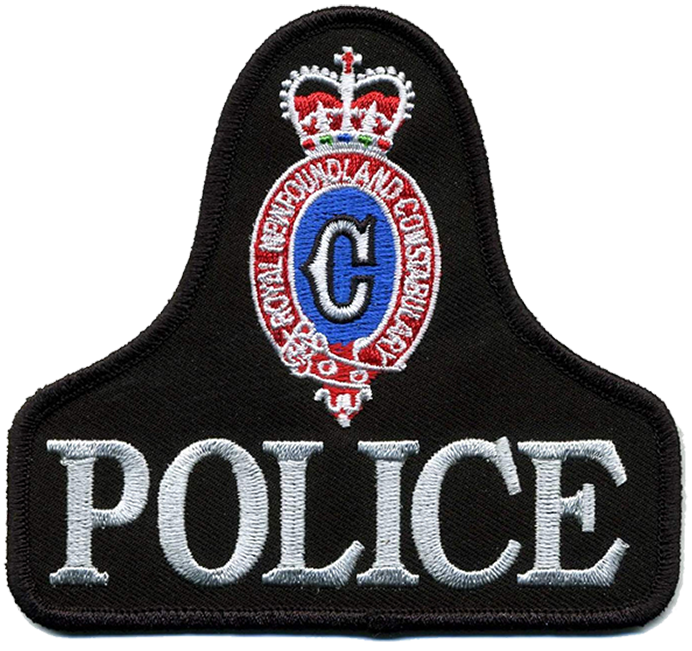
- Shirt and vest patch

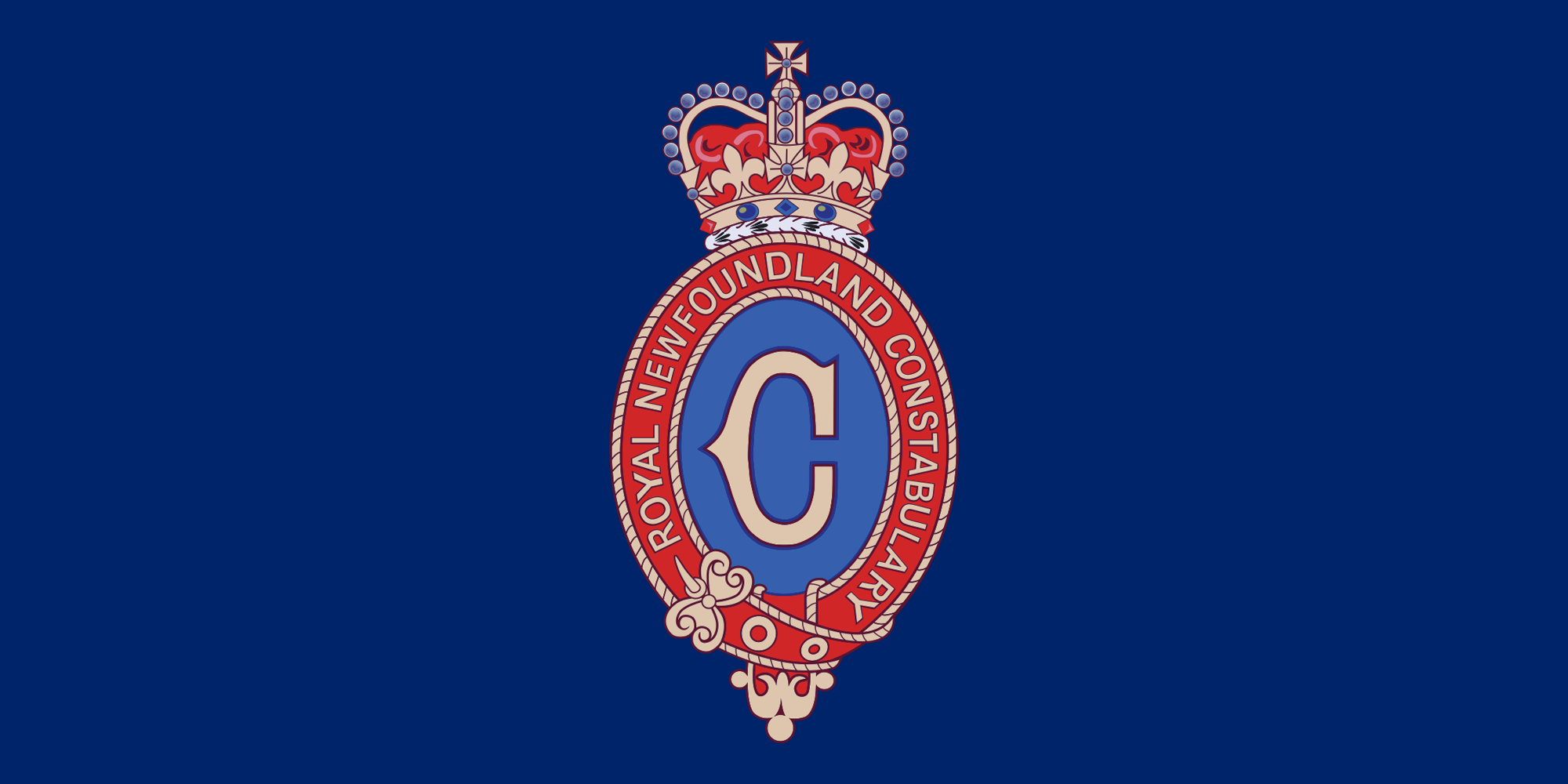
- RNC flag
- Abbreviation: RNC
- Motto: "Safer Communities Through Policing Excellence"

Agency overview
- Formed: 1841
- Preceding agency: Newfoundland Constabulary (1729)
- Employees: 545 (2015, approximately)
- Annual budget: Total RNC $60,043,208 Total Current $48,454,517 (2012-2013)

Jurisdictional structure
- Operations jurisdiction: Newfoundland and Labrador, Canada
- The area served by the Royal Newfoundland Constabulary
- Population: 526,702
- Legal jurisdiction: Provincial
- Governing body: His Majesty in Right of Newfoundland
- Constituting instrument: Royal Newfoundland Constabulary Act
- General nature: Civilian police

Operational structure
- Headquarters: 1 Fort Townshend, St. John's, Newfoundland and Labrador
- Officers: 420 (approximately)
- Civilians: 125 (approximately)
- Minister responsible: Helen Conway-Ottenheimer, Minister of Justice and Public Safety
- Agency executive: Patrick Roche, Chief

Facilities
- Office or detachments: 6

Website
- www.rnc.gov.nl.ca

The Royal Newfoundland Constabulary (RNC) is the provincial police service for the province of Newfoundland and Labrador.

The Royal Newfoundland Constabulary is one of three provincial police forces in Canada, alongside the Ontario Provincial Police and the Sûreté du Québec. Uniquely, the responsibility for policing in Newfoundland and Labrador is not granted to municipalities. In Ontario and Quebec, the provincial police provide frontline police services only to small communities or at the request of a municipal council; in Newfoundland and Labrador, the Constabulary operates in all communities by default. Since 1949, the Royal Canadian Mounted Police have provided police services in the province's rural interior, in place of the RNC.

As of 2023, the Constabulary currently serves or is expanding to serve the northeast Avalon Peninsula (metropolitan St. John's); Bay of Islands and the Humber Valley (metropolitan Corner Brook); and western Labrador (Churchill Falls, Labrador City, and Wabush).

== History ==
The first police constables in Newfoundland and Labrador were appointed by Governor Henry Osborn to six separate judicial districts in 1729. In the 19th century, the RNC was modelled after the Royal Irish Constabulary with the secondment in 1844 of Timothy Mitchell to be Inspector General. The administration of police services was centralized under one Inspector and General Superintendent of Police in 1853. Legislation governing the Newfoundland Constabulary was passed by the House of Assembly in 1871.

In January 1909, John J. Sullivan became the first Newfoundland-born police chief of the Constabulary, a post he held until September 1917.

In 1935, the Newfoundland Commission of Government established the Newfoundland Ranger Force, a police service modelled on the Royal Canadian Mounted Police, to serve rural parts of Newfoundland and Labrador. The Ranger Force replaced the Newfoundland Constabulary outside of the Avalon Peninsula, the Humber Arm (and in particular, the four communities that make up present-day Corner Brook), Grand Falls, and other built-up communities on the island.

During World War II, the Newfoundland Constabulary provided police and investigative services to the foreign militaries stationed at St. John's, famously investigating the 1942 Knights of Columbus Hostel fire, a fatal structure fire believed to have been an arson attack.

After Newfoundland and Labrador joined Canada in 1949, the Ranger Force was disbanded and replaced by the Royal Canadian Mounted Police, which also replaced the Newfoundland Constabulary outside of the City of St. John's.

In 1979, Queen Elizabeth II of Canada conferred a royal patronage on the Newfoundland Constabulary in recognition of its long history of service to Newfoundland and Labrador. The force subsequently changed its name to the Royal Newfoundland Constabulary.

The first women were sworn in as constables in 1980.

Between 1981 and 1986, the Royal Newfoundland Constabulary gradually re-expanded, replacing the RCMP in the northeast Avalon Region, parts of Labrador, and Corner Brook.

In 1998, RNC officers were authorized to begin carrying their handguns on their belt. Previously, officers were required to keep their firearms locked in the trunk of their car unless they were needed.

On May 3, 2005, the RNC made a formal exchange of colours with the Garda Síochána, one of two successor forces to the Royal Irish Constabulary. The exchange of colours was to mark the historic links between policing in Newfoundland and Ireland.

In 2019, the force hired its first Black police officers, Paul Growns and Jevaughn Coley.

In 2022, the Constabulary sparked controversy after it was revealed that a constable facing four domestic violence-related charges was granted the Chief of Police's Commendation, which recognizes "distinguished, commendable act of police duty or outstanding contribution to the RNC," during her criminal trial.

In 2023, the Constabulary re-expanded again, replacing the RCMP in the areas surrounding Corner Brook, to Pasadena in the northeast and the Bay of Islands in the west.

== Operations ==
The Royal Newfoundland Constabulary operates out of five police stations, referred to as regional offices or detachments:

- St. John's - serves as the Constabulary's headquarters
- Conception Bay South - Detachment (of the St. John's Regional Office)
- Churchill Falls - Detachment (of the Labrador West Regional Office)
- Corner Brook - Regional Office
- Labrador City / Wabush (Labrador West) - Regional Office

The Constabulary also maintains a satellite office of the St. John's Regional Office in Mount Pearl.

=== Organizational structure ===
| Rank | Commanding officers | | Senior officers | | Police officers | | | Officer-in-training |
| Rank | Chief | Deputy Chief | Superintendent | Inspector | Staff Sergeant | Sergeant | Constable | Cadet |
|---|---|---|---|---|---|---|---|---|
| INSIGNIA | | | | | | | | |

=== Specialized units ===
The Royal Newfoundland Constabulary maintains several specialized investigative and response units, including a tactical response team, criminal and general investigations units, a police dogs unit, a marine unit, a public order unit, and a collision reconstruction team.

==== Mounted unit ====
The RNC has operated a mounted unit since 1873.

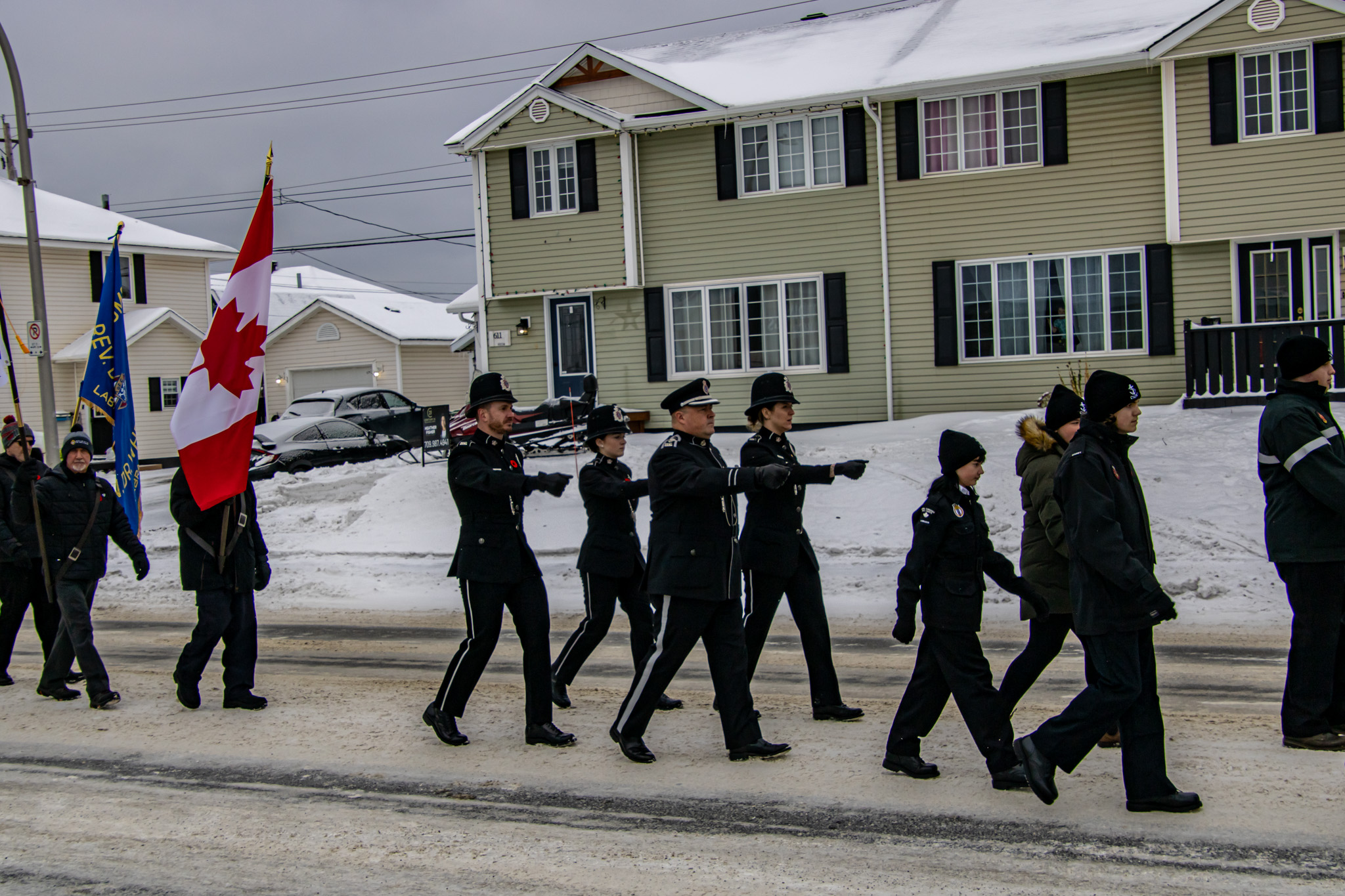
RNC Constables march in their dress uniforms along with Sea Cadets and other groups at the Labrador City Remembrance Day Parade, 2023

The current horse-mounted team was created in 2003, replacing a voluntary unit. The unit's history can be traced back to three earlier units, the Newfoundland Constabulary Mounted Force 1873–1894, New Fire Brigade Mounted Force 1895–1922, and Newfoundland Constabulary 1922–1951.

The unit has four Percheron horses:

- Dr. Rich
- Townshend
- Fraize
- Dobbin

== Fleet ==
The Royal Newfoundland Constabulary maintains a fleet of vehicles of models from several major automakers, such as models including but not limited to the following:

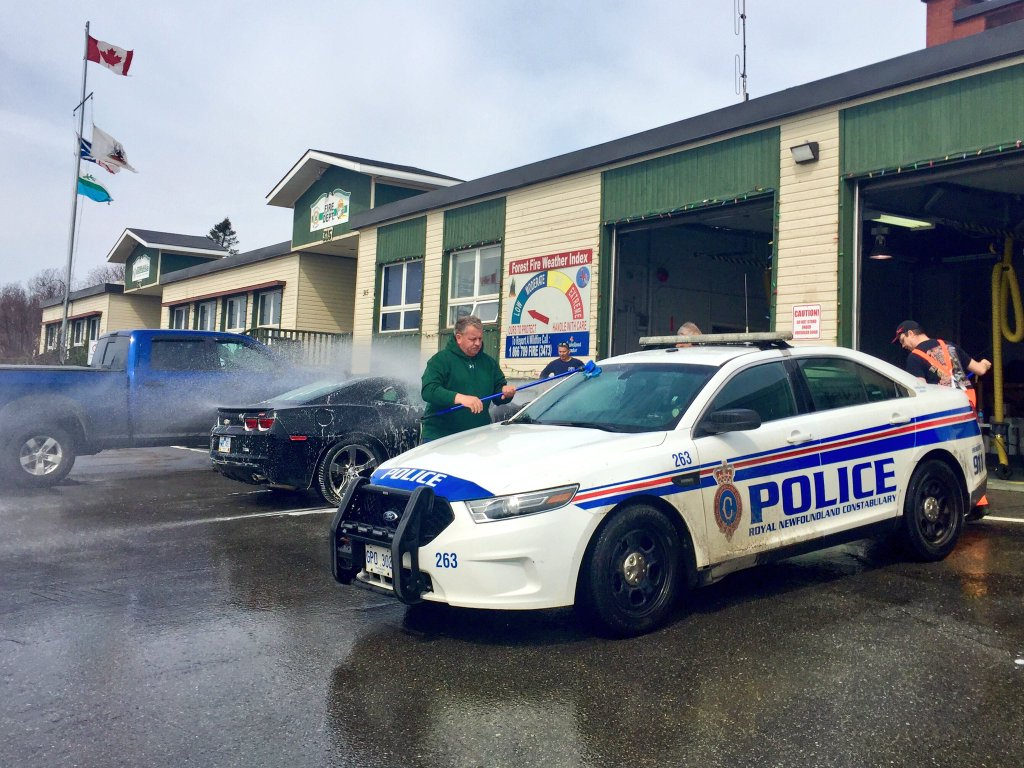
RNC Police Interceptor Ford Taurus at the Labrador City Town Hall.

| Make/Model | Type | Status | Origin |
|---|---|---|---|
| Chevrolet Impala | General police vehicle | | Canada |
| Chevrolet Tahoe | (marked) General police vehicle, Traffic Services | | Canada |
| Chevrolet Silverado | (marked) General police vehicle, Forensic Identification Section | | Canada |
| Dodge Charger | General police vehicle | | Canada |
| Ram pickup | Parking Enforcement, Document Services Section | | United States |
| Ford Police Interceptor | Highway Unit, General police vehicle, Traffic Services | | United States |
| Ford Expedition | (marked) Supervisor Truck, Traffic Services, Special Operations | | United States |
| Ford F-150 | General police vehicle, Forensic Services Section | | United States |
| GMC Sierra | General police vehicle | | United States |
| Dodge Durango | General police vehicle | | United States |
| Ford Explorer (Ford Police Interceptor Utility) (2020+) | General police vehicle | | United States |

- Other vehicles are commissioned for special purposes, such as the Tactics and Rescue Unit (TRU), Dog Services, Mounted Unit Transport, and Evidence Collection.
- 29-foot Mercury Rigid Hull Inflatable Boat (RHIB) with twin 200HP engines
- The RNC has no helicopters, and instead relies on the RCMP to provide police helicopter services.

== Equipment ==
As a result of the recommendations of the Select Committee on the Arming Policy of the RNC, members on operational duty were permitted to wear sidearms starting 14 June 1998. Previously, members were required to keep all firearms secured in the trunk of the police cruiser and were only deployed with permission from the Chief.

| Model | Type | Image | Origin | Details |
|---|---|---|---|---|
| SIG Sauer P226 | Handgun | | Germany | |
| Colt C8 Patrol Carbine | Semi-automatic rifle | | Canada | |
| Remington Model 870 | Shotgun | | United States | |
| Pepper spray | Lachrymatory agent | | Canada | |
| Armament Systems and Procedures baton | Collapsible baton | | United States | |
| Taser X26 | Electroshock weapon | | United States | |

== See also ==
- Custodian helmet
- List of Canadian organizations with royal patronage
- Royal Canadian Mounted Police
- Royal Irish Constabulary
- Newfoundland Ranger Force—police force that patrolled less populated areas of Newfoundland from 1935 until 1949.
