= Congregation of Christian Brothers =

Religious community within the Catholic Church

- Congregatio Fratrum Christianorum

- Abbreviation: CFC
- Formation: 1802; 224 years ago
- Founder: Edmund Ignatius Rice
- Founded at: Waterford, Ireland
- Type: Lay Religious Congregation of Pontifical Right (for Men)
- Members: 680 members (2024)
- motto: Latin: Facere et docere (English: 'To do and to teach')
- General Motherhouse: Via Marcantonio Colonna 9, 00192 Rome, Italy

The Congregation of Christian Brothers (Latin: Congregatio Fratrum Christianorum; abbreviated CFC) is a worldwide religious community within the Catholic Church, founded by Edmund Rice.

Their first school opened in Waterford, Ireland, in 1802. At the time of its foundation, though much relieved from the harshest of the Penal Laws by the Relief Acts, Catholics faced much discrimination throughout the newly created United Kingdom of Great Britain and Ireland pending full Catholic emancipation in 1829.

This congregation is sometimes referred to as simply "the Christian Brothers", leading to confusion with the De La Salle Brothers—also known as the Christian Brothers, sometimes by Lasallian organisations themselves. As such, Rice's congregation is sometimes called the Irish Christian Brothers or the Edmund Rice Christian Brothers.

== History ==
=== Formation of the Christian Brothers ===
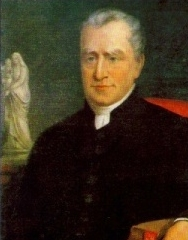
Edmund Rice

At the turn of the nineteenth century, Waterford merchant Edmund Rice considered travelling to Rome to join a religious institute, possibly the Augustinians. Instead, with the support of Thomas Hussey, Bishop of Waterford and Lismore, he decided to found a religious community dedicated to teaching disadvantaged youth.

The first school, on Waterford's New Street, was a converted stable and opened in 1802, with a second school opening in Stephen Street soon after to cater for increasing enrollment. Two men from his hometown of Callan, Thomas Grosvenor and Patrick Finn, soon arrived to aid Rice in his makeshift schools, with the intention of living the life of lay brothers. In the same year, Rice used proceeds from the sale of his victualling business to begin building a community house and school on land provided by the diocese. Bishop Hussey opened the new complex, christened "Mount Sion" on 7 June 1803, and pupils were transferred to the new school building the following year. The reputation of the school spread and across the next few years several men sought to become "Michaels".

On 15 August 1808, seven men, including Edmund Rice, took religious promises under Bishop John Power of Waterford. Following the example of Nano Nagle's Presentation Sisters, they were called "Presentation Brothers". This was one of the first congregations of men to be founded in Ireland and one of the few founded in the Church by a layman.

Houses were soon opened in Carrick-on-Suir, Dungarvan, and in 1811, in Cork. In 1812 the Archbishop of Dublin established a community in the nation's capital and by 1907 there were ten communities in Dublin, with pupils in excess of 6,000. The schools included primary, secondary and technical schools, along with orphanages and a school for the deaf. A community was founded in Limerick in 1816, followed by establishments in several of Ireland's principal towns.

The Holy See formally established the congregation in 1820. This, too, was an unusual event, since the Christian Brothers were the first Irish congregation of men approved by a charter from Rome.

Some brothers in Cork chose to remain under the original Presentation rule and continued to be known as Presentation Brothers, a separate congregation but also recognising Edmund Rice as its Founder.

=== Expansion ===
The congregation of Irish Christian Brothers spread to Liverpool and other parts of England. These new ventures were not always immediately successful. Two brothers had been sent to Gibraltar to establish an institute in 1835. However, despite initial successes they left in August 1837 on account of disagreements with the local priests. In 1878 the Brothers returned to the then Crown colony of Gibraltar. The school eventually flourished supplying education to the twentieth century. The "Line Wall College" was noted in 1930 for the education that it supplied to "well to do" children.

Similarly, a mission to Sydney, Australia, in 1842 failed within a couple of years. Brother Ambrose Treacy established a presence in Melbourne, Australia, in 1868, in 1875 in Brisbane, Australia, and, in 1876, a school was commenced in Dunedin, New Zealand. In 1875 a school was opened in St. John's, Newfoundland. In 1886 the Pope requested that they consider setting up in India, and a province of the congregation was established there.

Christian Brothers' College Kimberley ("CBC"), the first Christian Brothers' College (School) in South Africa, was founded by the Christian Brothers from Ireland, UK, on 8 September 1897. It is a high school in Kimberley, Northern Cape, South Africa, founded by E.I.Rice.

In 1900, the Brothers were invitated to establish houses in Rome, and in 1906 schools were established in New York City. In 1940 Iona College was founded in New York, as a Higher Education College, facilitating poorer high school graduates to progress to a college education.St. Patrick's Christian Brothers' College, Kimberley

St. Joseph's Junior Novitiate, Baldoyle was where trainee brothers went to complete their second level studies, normally proceeding to St. Mary's in Marino to train as school teachers. To-day there is a nursing home there, and there are over 1000 brothers buried in the cemetery in St. Patrick's, Baldoyle.

In 1925 the brothers bought St. Helen's, Booterstown which became their administrative headquarters and novitiate. Around 1968, land to the South was used to build two new schools Coláiste Eoin and Coláiste Íosagáin. St. Helen's was sold in 1988.

In 1955 Stella Maris College in Uruguay was established. In 1972 the alumnus rugby team was travelling in Uruguayan Air Force Flight 571 when it crashed in the Andes, stranding survivors in freezing conditions with little food and no heat for 72 days; 16 of the 45 people on the aircraft survived.

In the 1950s, due to the number of brothers in Ireland, it was split into two sections divided into North and South by a line from Dublin to Galway.

In 1967 the Christian Brothers had a membership of about 5,000, teaching in around 600 schools.

The Christian Brothers teacher training centre at St. Mary's/Colaiste Mhuire, has become the Marino Institute for Education which has trained lay teachers since 1972 and has offered degrees validated by the University of Dublin since 1974. In 2012 Trinity College Dublin became a co-trustee with the Brothers of the institute.

The Brothers' schools include primary, secondary and technical schools, orphanages and schools for the deaf. A number of these technical schools originally taught poor children trades, such as carpentry and building skills, after which they could progress to gain apprenticeships and employment. As the National School system and vocational schools developed in the Irish Republic, the Irish Christian Brothers became more concentrated on secondary education.

=== Contraction ===
As of 2018, there were 872 Christian Brothers and 172 houses.

In 2008 it was reported that not more than ten Christian Brothers were teaching in Irish schools, with the expectation that there would soon be none. This was contrasted with the mid-1960s, when over 1,000 Brothers worked in schools, with no shortage of new recruits. The last teaching brother in Ireland died in 2019.

Remaining Christian Brothers schools in the Republic of Ireland were vested into the newly created Edmund Rice Schools Trust in 2008.

== Organizational structure of the Christian Brothers ==
Traditional crest of the Christian Brothers, incorporating the Latin motto Facere et docere ("To Do and To Teach"). Many schools run by the Brothers feature the cross in their school logo.

Geographically, the Christian Brothers are divided into five provinces that encompass every inhabited continent. The brothers within each province work under the direction of a Province Leadership Team. In turn, the entire Congregation operates under the leadership of a Congregation Leadership Team based in Rome, led by the Congregation Leader. These provincial and congregational teams are elected on a six-year basis at Congregation chapters.

Restructuring took place in the congregation in consequence of the discovery of pervasive physical and sexual abuse of children by Christian brothers going back decades, in particular the findings of what has come to be known in Ireland as the Ryan Report, published in 2009. This led to declining numbers of brothers in the developed world. The three provinces of North America (Canada, Eastern American, and Western American Province) restructured into the Edmund Rice Christian Brothers North America on 1 July 2005. The provinces that cover Ireland, Great Britain and the Congregational Leadership Team in Rome combined into a single European province on May 5, 2007, while the five provinces covering Australia, New Zealand and Papua New Guinea combined into one Oceania province on 1 October 2007, The English Province is a registered charity. The Dublin Headquarters are in the grounds of Marino Institute of Education. A special community within this new European province will be based in Geneva, Switzerland, working to establish an NGO known as Edmund Rice International. The purpose of such an organization is to gain what is known as a "general consultative status" with the United Nations. "This position allows groups the opportunity to challenge systemic injustice and to engage in advocacy work with policymakers on behalf of people who are made poor." As well as including Christian Brothers from provinces all over the world, members of the Presentation Brothers will also have a presence within this community.

Edmund Rice Development is a faith-based non-governmental organization with charity status in Ireland. Based in Dublin, Edmund Rice Development was established in 2009, to facilitate the 161m euros (£145m), agreed with the Irish Government, to be paid in restitution for the historic abuse identified in the recently published Ryan Report. It was accorded charitable status shortly thereafter. Funding raised by the charity is directed mainly to nine countries in Africa, where The Christian Brothers work on mission in development: Ghana, Kenya, Liberia, Sierra Leone, South Africa, South Sudan, Tanzania, Zambia, and Zimbabwe. In Kenya, they support the Ruben Centre and Mary Rice center in Kibera Additional funds are also raised for similar work in South America (Argentina, Bolivia, Paraguay, Peru and Uruguay) and India.

=== List of Superiors General ===
The following is a list of the Superiors General of the Congregation of Christian Brothers.

1. Edmund Ignatius Rice (1820–1838)
2. Michael Paul Riordan (1838–1862)
3. James Aloysius Hoare (1862–1880)
4. Richard Anthony Maxwell (1880–1900)
5. Michael Titus Moylan (1900–1905)
6. Calasanctius Whitty(1905–1920)
7. Jerome Hennessy (1920–1930)
8. Joseph Pius Noonan (1930–1950)
9. Edward Ferdinand Clancy (1950–1966)
10. Arthur Austin Loftus (1966–1972)
11. Justin Linus Ketty (1972–1978)
12. Gerald Gabriel McHugh (1978–1990)
13. Jeremiah Columba Keating (1990–1997)
14. Edmund Michael Garvey (1997–2001)
15. Alvaro Rodríguez Echeverría (2001–2002)
16. Philip Pinto (2002–2014)
17. Hugh James O'Neill (2014–2022)
18. Peter Bernard Clinch (2022–2024)
19. John Gerard Casey (2024–)

== Irish nationalism ==
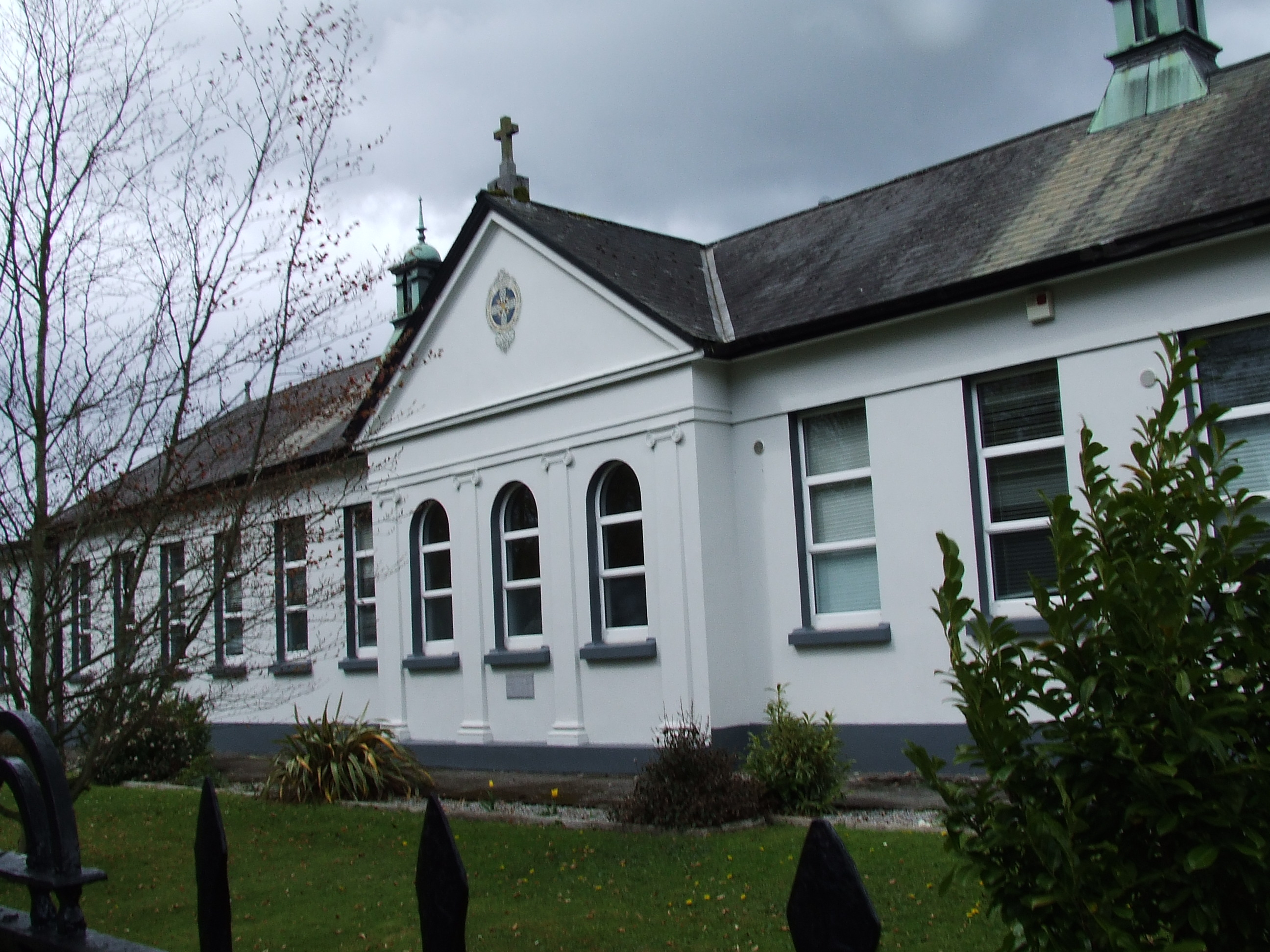
CBS Templemore, Co. Tipperary April 2010

The Irish Christian Brothers were among the strongest supporters of Irish republicanism, the Irish language revival, the Gaelic Athletic Association, and Gaelic games. In most Christian Brothers' schools in Ireland, Gaelic football, hurling and handball were encouraged and there were even examples of boys being punished for playing "foreign games", like soccer. Many GAA clubs were founded by Christian Brothers, many developing from schools teams, with many GAA clubs using the playing fields of the brothers' schools. They also run and sponsor The Rice Cup which was set up in 1944, and named after the order's founder, for post-primary hurling. They also sponsor the Westcourt Cup and Rice Shield. Many of the first Irish language textbooks were produced by the Christian brothers for their schools. Conor Cruise O'Brien called them "the most indefatigable and explicit carriers" of the Catholic nation idea.

== Sexual abuse of children ==
In the late 20th and early 21st century many cases were exposed of emotional, physical and sexual abuse of children in the Christian Brothers' care over a number of decades. Cases emerged in Ireland, Canada, the United States, Australia and Great Britain.

=== Australia ===
The Royal Commission into Institutional Responses to Child Sexual Abuse documented Christian Brothers' activities in Australia and in particular in Ballarat. 22% of Christian Brothers across Australia have been alleged sexual predators since 1950, according to the royal commission. The commissioners concluded that the Christian Brothers "completely failed... to protect the most vulnerable children in their care" and that senior brothers—including Brother Paul Nangle, Ballarat's highest Brother in the 1970s—had deliberately misled police in more recent statements about their knowledge of abuse.

There were allegations that during the 1970s sexual abuses took place at the junior campus of St Patrick's College and St Alipius Primary School in Ballarat, Victoria. After investigation, Brothers Robert Best, Edward Dowlan and Stephen Francis Farrell were all convicted of sex crimes. Brothers Dowlan and Best were later transferred to the senior campus and continued to offend. Four of the school's brothers and their chaplain, Gerald Ridsdale, were accused of sexually assaulting children—all but one, who died before charges could be laid, have been convicted.

In December 2014, a royal commission found that "Christian Brothers leaders knew of allegations of sexual abuse of children at four Western Australian orphanages and failed to manage the homes to prevent the systemic ill-treatment for decades." During the 2016 Royal Commission into Institutional Responses to Child Sexual Abuse in Ballarat, it was found that 853 children, average age 13, had been sexually abused by one or more Christian Brothers. Child abuse complaints had been made against 281 Christian Brothers, and the Congregation had paid A$37.3 million in compensation.

The Royal Commission's final report of Catholic Church authorities in Ballarat was released on 6 December 2017. The report found that 56 Christian Brothers had claims of sexual abuse made against them in Ballarat and that there "was a complete failure by the Christian Brothers to protect the most vulnerable children in their care".

The response to complaints of sexual abuse was "grossly inadequate": most often Christian Brothers were moved to new locations after an allegation had been made.

The Report found: "Often, the Christian Brother in question was allowed to remain in the position he held where the allegations arose, with continuing access to children," and "On many occasions, the Brother was moved to a new location after a complaint or allegation was made about his conduct. In some cases, the reason given for the move was to conceal the true reason for it and to protect the reputation of the Christian Brothers and avoid scandal and embarrassment."

In February 2020, Rex Francis Elmer pleaded guilty to two charges of indecently assaulting boys at St Vincent's Boys' Orphanage in South Melbourne. He was removed from St Vincent's in 1976 after a welfare officer who inspected the orphanage complained that he had “interfered with” boys who lived at the home. He was appointed headmaster of a Melbourne Catholic boys' school a few years after the religious order became aware of his abuse.

In 2026, Guardian Australia reported that the order had engaged in a systematic transfer of assets to Edmund Rice Education Australia in what appears to be a systematic attempt to protect assets from civil litigation.

=== Ireland and Great Britain ===
==== England ====
In December 2012, the Christian Brothers school St Ambrose College, Altrincham, Greater Manchester, was implicated in a child sex abuse case. A former lay teacher was convicted of nineteen counts of sexual assault occurring between 1972 and 1991.

==== Ireland ====
St Joseph's Industrial School in Letterfrack, County Galway, Republic of Ireland received a lasting notoriety through revelation of physical and sexual abuse of the boys by some of the Brothers there, with evidence of sexual abuse and extreme physical punishments going back to the 1930s. According to the Commission to Inquire into Child Abuse, between the years 1940 to 1970 15 children died there while in the care of the Christian Brothers, from causes including tuberculosis.

The school was closed in 1974. The Congregation of the Christian Brothers published full-page advertisements in newspapers in Ireland in March 1998, apologizing to former pupils who had been ill-treated whilst in their care. This advertising campaign expressed "deep regret" on behalf of the Christian Brothers and listed telephone lines which former pupils could ring if they needed help. In 2003 the Congregation brought a case against the Commission to Inquire into Child Abuse, seeking to prevent the commission from naming brothers accused of child abuse. Justice Sean Ryan declared that individual alleged perpetrators of abuse would not be named unless they had already been convicted

In May 2009 a report was issued by the Commission to Inquire into Child Abuse (CICA) on allegations of child abuse committed on thousands of children in residential care institutions run by various religious institutes for the Irish state. This report found that sexual abuse of boys in institutions run by the Brothers was common. In response, the Irish ecclesiastical province issued a pledge to pay 161 million euros toward a fund set up to compensate male and female victims of such abuse both in their institutions and in those run by other religious institutes. As of 2013, the Christian Brothers in Ireland continued to seek out-of-court settlement for historical claims initiated by survivors of sexual assault by Brothers, committed in day schools managed by the order in Ireland. Towards Healing was set up by CORI to offer therapy to survivors of clerical abuse; it is a Catholic organisation about whose independence there has been controversy. The Christian brothers in Ireland used the services of the L&P group to set up an education trust.

In late November 2009, the organization announced it would supply a €161 million (£145 million sterling) package as part of reparations for child abuse in Ireland. This includes a donation of €30 million to a government trust and €4 million donated to provide counselling services. Playing fields owned by the organisation and valued at €127 million would be transferred to joint ownership of the government and the trust that runs former Christian Brothers schools.

In 2019 former Brother John Gibson was convicted and received a prison sentence for his role in abuse in Wexford CBS in the 1980s and 1990s. On 22 June 2020, he received an additional four years after pleading guilty to a number of assault and sexual assault charges.

Mary O'Toole writes that "In total, 820 allegations of abuse are recorded in relation to those 132 schools." "303" people were accused "84%" of whom were Christian Brother members, "14%" were lay staff and a further "2%" were other Clergy. Of those allegations "16 members and former members of the Christian Brothers have been convicted of child sexual abuse", "5 lay staff have been convicted of child sexual abuse" and "1 member of the clergy associated with their school who was not a Christian Brother has been convicted, though the order is unsure if this conviction was for offences in one of their schools."

==== Northern Ireland ====
In Northern Ireland, Christian Brother and former school principal Paul Dunleavy was convicted of 72 counts involving 18 victims over three trials for sexual offences against boys in his care at four schools in Belfast, Newry and Armagh between 1964 and 1991. At his third sentencing, in 2024 aged 89, a police spokesman said "There is only one place for Dunleavy and that is behind bars. He will die in prison." The Christian Brothers declined to comment.

==== Scotland ====
In 2016 Brother John Bernard Farrell, retired priest of the Diocese of Motherwell, the last Head teacher at St Ninian's Falkland, Fife, was sentenced to five years' imprisonment. His colleague Brother Paul Vincent Kelly, a former member of the Order and a retired teacher from Portsmouth, was given a ten year custodial sentence; both were convicted of the physical and sexual abuse of boys between the years 1979 and 1983. More than 100 charges involving 35 boys were made. The school closed in 1983.

In 2021, the Scottish Child Abuse Inquiry issued a report on the St. Ninians residential school which had been run by the Christian Brothers between 1953 and 1983. The report concluded that the school was a "a place of abuse and deprivation particularly from 1969 until the school closed in 1983. The Christian Brothers were able to "pursue their abusive practices with impunity" and the evidence against them was "shocking and distressing." Children in care suffered sexual, physical and emotional abuse. Others named were "Brother William Gerard Ryan" and "Brother Christopher Urban McNamara".

Michael Madigan, a representative for the Christian Brothers, said the congregation acknowledged with deepest regret that children had been abused.

=== Canada ===
A pattern of physical and sexual abuse of more than 300 Mount Cashel Orphanage residents in St. John's, Newfoundland, perpetrated by staff members, specifically members of the Christian Brothers of Ireland in Canada (CBIC), was uncovered during the late 1980s and early 1990s.

Multiple criminal investigations, a provincial Royal Commission of Inquiry (the Hughes Inquiry) and an Archdiocese of St. John's inquiry (the Winter Commission) resulted in criminal convictions and millions of dollars in court-imposed financial settlements. Compensation was provided by the Government of Newfoundland for orphanage residents who were wards of the state and several properties owned by the CBIC in Newfoundland and Labrador and other provinces were seized and liquidated.

Throughout 1989-1993 nine Christian Brothers were charged and prosecuted for various criminal offences, including sex offences against the boys of Mount Cashel orphanage.

Both the St. John's Archdiocese through the Canadian Conference of Catholic Bishops as well as the Congregation of Christian Brothers have since enacted policies aimed at the prevention of child sexual abuse.

In Ontario in January 1993 the Christian Brothers reached a financial settlement totalling $23 million with 700 former students who alleged abuse.

In February 2021, a British Columbia man alleged that he was sexually abused by one of the Christian Brothers, who confessed to the Royal Newfoundland Constabulary of molesting children at the Mount Cashel Orphanage in 1975.

=== India ===
Despite a culture of silence around child sexual abuse in India, abuses that began decades ago continue into the 21st century, though few allegations see the light of day. Mathew N. Schmalz, director of Asian Studies at the Jesuit College of the Holy Cross in Worcester, has researched Catholicism in Asia and Africa, and argues that although celibate men are viewed as sexually aberrant in the United States, they are held in respect in Asia. According to him "In India you'd have gossip and rumors, but it never reaches the level of formal charges or controversies." While prosecution of a few egregious cases has happened, most cases are never revealed, investigated, punished or prosecuted, even though more lawsuits are being filed against the Congregation of Christian Brothers in India (CCBI) for the trauma caused by Brothers, whether alive or deceased. One case that emerged during the #MeToo movement was of Brother Francis Gale who was alleged in a detailed Facebook post to have molested Mary Therese Kurkalang, a tribal woman, since she was five years old, inflicting lifelong trauma, when he was stationed at St. Edmund's College, Shillong. Despite an internal investigation that began in 2018 by the "Society Protection Officer" Brother J. Johnson, he was not prosecuted and remained a member of the Brothers as of January 2023.

=== United States ===
Christian Brother Robert Brouillette, who had taught at St. Laurence High School, was arrested in April 1998 in Joliet, Illinois, for indecent solicitation of a child. He was convicted in March 2000 of 10 charges related to child pornography, fined $2,000 and sentenced to four years probation. In 2002 a civil lawsuit was filed in Cook County, Illinois, against Brouillette for sexual assault against a 21-year-old man.

In 2013 the Edmund Rice Christian Brothers' North American Province, known as Irish Christian Brothers, paid US$16.5 million to 400 victims of child sexual abuse across the US, and agreed to enforce a zero-tolerance policy for brothers accused of abuse. This followed the Brothers' filing for bankruptcy in April 2011 following rising legal costs, and leading to a reorganization settlement between creditors and the order according to the US Chapter 11 bankruptcy code.

== Publications ==
The Christian brothers composed and published a number of text books on several subjects, many in the Irish language, which were used by their schools.

=== Textbooks ===
- Irish History Reader, Christian Brothers, M. H. Gill & Son, Dublin, 1905.
- Graiméar na Gaeidhilge, Na Bráithre Críostaí, M. H. Gill, Dublin, 1901.
- Graiméar Gaeilge na mBráithre Críosta, M.H. Mac an Ghoill agus a Mhac Teo, Baile Átha Cliath, 1960.
- Matamaitic na hArdteistiméireachta, by Tomás Ó Catháin, Na Bráithre Críostaí, 1967.
- Leaving Certificate Chemistry, Christian Brothers Congregation, Folens, Dublin, 1970?.
- Leaving Certificate Physics [translated from the Irish], Christian Brothers Congregation, Folens, Dublin, 1973.
- New Irish Grammer, Christian Brothers, published by C. J. Fallon, Dublin, 1990.
- Aids to Irish Composition by Christian Brothers (Jerome Fitzpatrick), 1902.
- Second Book of Modern Geography, The Christian Brothers, M. H. Gill & Son, Dublin, 1904.
- Christian Politeness and Counsels for Youth, The Christian Brothers, Strathfield, N.S.W., 1937.
- Cóir ṁúinte na Gaeḋilge, leis Na Bráiṫre Críostaí, M.H. mac an Goill, Baile áṫa cliaṫ, 1910.
- First Steps in Irish: A classic, succinct, book for learning to read, write and speak the Irish language, by L. Cinneide, The Christian Brothers.

=== Our Boys ===
Our Boys was a magazine for boys by Christian Brothers and the Educational Company of Ireland, published from September 1914 until the 1990s. It was based on British Boys Own adventure comics, with illustrated strips and adventure stories in English and Irish. It had an overt Catholic and Irish Nationalist outlook, featuring Irish Legends, GAA figures, the Missions and Catholic juvenile organisations. Illustrator Gerrit van Gelderen contributed to the magazine.

=== The Educational Record ===
The Educational Record was an annual collection of articles from Christian brother schools around the world published by them from their offices in Rome. Editors of the record include Liam Ó hAnluain and Richard Healy.

== Notable Christian Brothers ==
- Seamus Damien Brennan, teacher, principal, Hurling Manager, last teaching Christian brother in Ireland.
- Laurence (Larry) Ennis (1933–2021), served as Antrim Gaelic football team manager from 1979 to 1981
- Jerome Fitzpatrick (1878–1910) – teacher and Irish Language enthusiast, and compiled and published many early aids to teaching the Irish language.
- Gerald Griffin (1803–1840), Irish novelist, poet and playwright.
- John Philip Holland – inventor of the motor-powered submarine
- Thomas Munchin Keane (1908–1989), teacher, and mathematician, wrote the first textbook for the new leaving certificate mathematics in Irish in the 1960s.
- Paul Francis Keaney – Australian educator
- Joseph G. McKenna – American educator
- Paul Nunan – Australian educator
- Liam Ó hAnluain (1910–1992), Irish language scholar contributed major contribution to a standard for Irish Grammer, he also served as provincial of the order.
- Godfrey Reggio – became a film director of Koyaanisqatsi after being a brother in the US.
- Blessed Edmund Ignatius Rice – founder of the Christian Brothers and the Presentation Brothers
- Michael Paul Riordan – Irish early Christian Brother and second Superior General of the congregation
- Patrick Ambrose Treacy – Australian educator and leader of the first Australian community of Christian Brothers.

This list does not include Brothers notable for misdeeds, included in section Sexual abuse of children and article Sexual abuse cases in the Congregation of Christian Brothers.

== In popular culture ==
- The play The Christian Brothers, first performed in 1975 and written by Ron Blair, is a one-man show depicting a Christian Brother teaching at a Catholic school in Australia in the 1950s, focusing much on the Brother's use of corporal punishment.
- In the 1985 film Lamb, Liam Neeson plays a Christian brother
- The television miniseries The Boys of St. Vincent is a fictional story based on real events of sexual abuse that took place at Mount Cashel Orphanage in St. John's, Newfoundland and Labrador, an orphanage run by the Christian Brothers.
- In 1994, the CBC released "The unforgiven: Mount Cashel, five years later," a documentary that profiled several of Mount Cashel's victims.
- The 2016 film Sing Street is about a coming of age drama where a boy moves from a private fee-paying school to a Christian brother school "Synge Street"
- In 2022, an episode of the CBC television series Son of a Critch discussed the real-time impact that the initial revelations of the Mount Cashel Orphanage scandal had on Newfoundland society in the 1980s.

== See also ==
- Catholic religious order
- Catholic spirituality
- Presentation Brothers
- Congregation of Christian Brothers in New Zealand
- Consecrated life
- List of Christian Brothers schools
- Margaret Humphreys, and The Child Migrant's Trust
- Roman Catholic sex abuse cases
- Abuse by priests in Roman Catholic orders
