= Jerome Fitzpatrick =

Irish teacher and language activist

Jerome Fitzpatrick (1878 in Cork – 1910 in Dublin), was an Irish Christian Brother, teacher, author and Irish Language enthusiast. A supporter of the Gaelic League and Irish language Revival, Fitzpatrick is noted for compiling and publishing many early books and aids to teaching the language.

Jerome Fitzpatrick was born in 1878 (some records suggest 1877) in Cork and educated at the North Monastery, Christian Brothers School. He joined the Christian Brothers, went to the Christian Brothers training school, St. Josephs, Baldoyle, Co. Dublin, and became a teacher. Fitzpatrick taught at Synge Street. CBS, in Dublin and in CBS Sexton Street in Limerick.

Fitzpatrick produced eleven books on the Irish Language. At the time the authors who were brothers would not have been individually credited in publications, only the order would have been credited. During his life when producing Irish Language publications, Fitzpatrick would have been in communication with Irish Language Revivalists, such as Eoin MacNeill and Douglas Hyde.

Fitzpatrick died in 1910 in Dublin.

== Publications ==
- First Irish Grammer, Br. J. Fitzpatrick, Christian Brothers.
- Aids to Irish Composition, Br. J. Fitzpatrick, and Br. V. Casey, 1907.
- Aids to the Pronunciation of Irish, Br. J. Fitzpatrick.
