= Edmund Ignatius Rice =

Catholic missionary (1762–1844)

Blessed Edmund Ignatius Rice F.P.M., C.F.C.
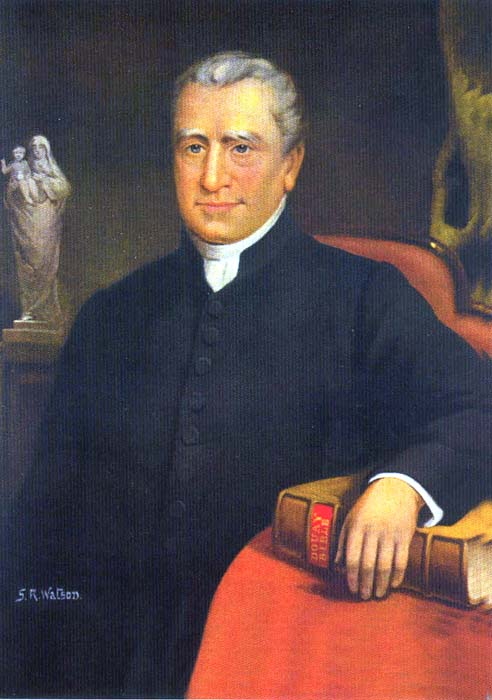

Religious, Founder, Missionary, Educator
- Born: 1 June 1762; Callan, Ireland
- Died: 29 August 1844 (aged 82); Waterford, Ireland
- Venerated in: Catholic Church
- Beatified: 6 October 1996, Vatican City by Pope John Paul II
- Major shrine: Westcourt, Callan, Ireland; International Heritage Centre, Mount Sion, Waterford, Ireland
- Feast: 5 May
- Attributes: Irish Christian Brothers' Black Habit

Edmund Ignatius Rice, F.P.M., C.F.C. (Irish: Éamonn Iognáid Rís; 1 June 1762 – 29 August 1844) was a Catholic missionary and educationalist who founded two institutes of religious brothers: the Congregation of Christian Brothers and the Presentation Brothers.

Rice was born in Ireland at a time when Catholics faced oppression under Penal Laws enforced by the British authorities, though reforms began in 1778 when he was a teenager. He forged a successful career in business and, after an accident that killed his wife and left his daughter disabled and with learning difficulties, devoted his life to the education of the poor.

Christian Brothers and Presentation Brothers schools around the world continue to follow the traditions established by Rice (see List of Christian Brothers schools).

== Early life and education ==
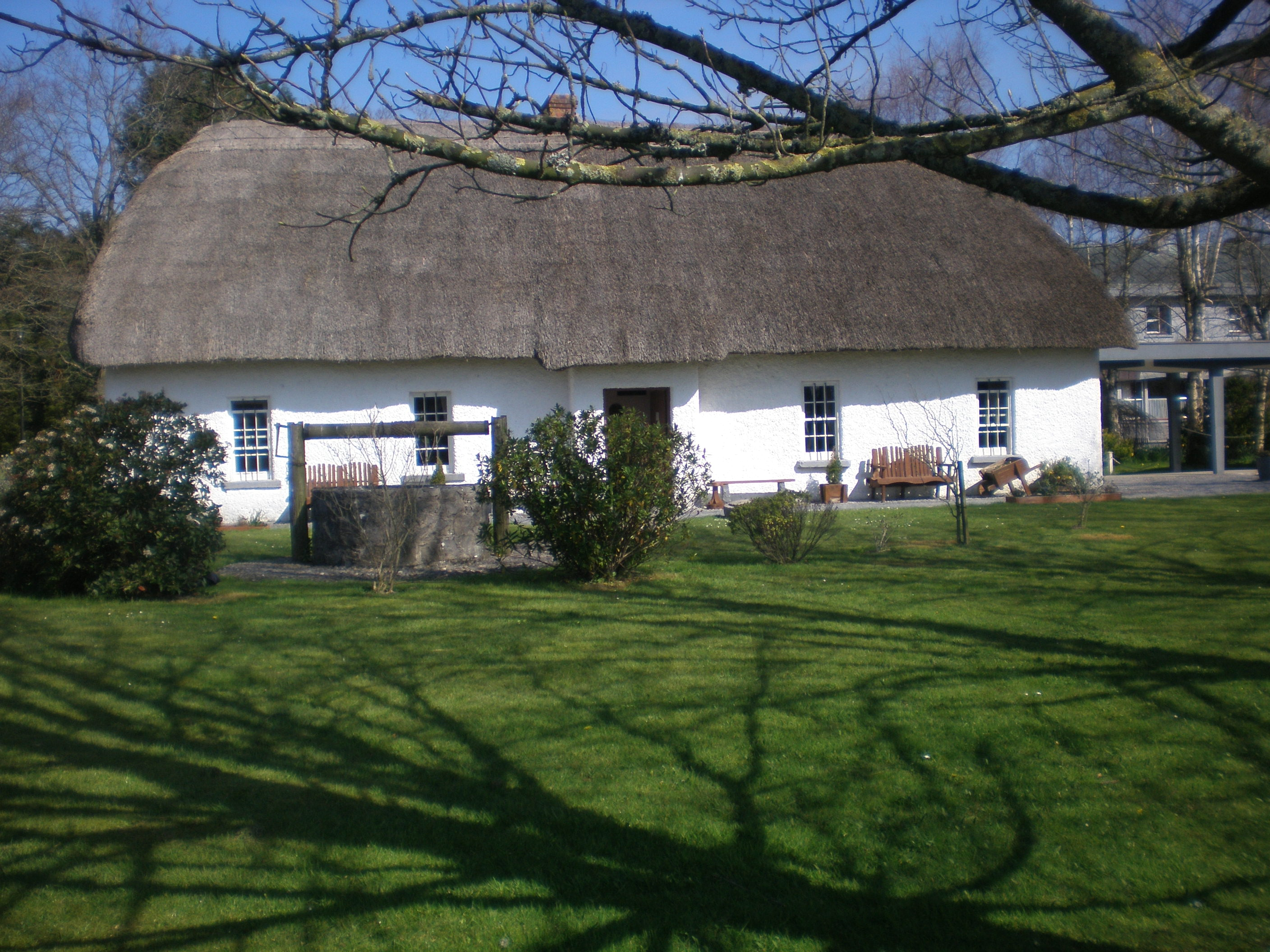
Rice's childhood home at Callan, c.2007

Edmund Ignatius Rice was born to Robert Rice and Margaret Rice (née Tierney) on the farming property of "Westcourt", in Callan, County Kilkenny. Edmund Rice was the fourth of seven sons, although he also had two half-sisters, Joan and Jane Murphy, the offspring of his mother's first marriage.

Rice's education, like that of every other Irish Catholic of the day, was greatly compromised by the 1709 amendment to the Popery Act, which decreed that any public or private instruction in the Catholic faith would render teachers liable to prosecution, a measure that was not reformed until 1782. In that environment, hedge schools proliferated. The boys of the Rice family obtained education at home through Patrick Grace, a member of the small community of Augustinian friars in Callan. As a young man, Rice spent two years at a school which, despite the provisions of the penal laws, the authorities suffered to exist in the City of Kilkenny.

His uncle Michael owned a merchant business in the nearby port town of Waterford. In 1779, Edmund was apprenticed to him, moving into a house in the market parish of Ballybricken, entering the business of trading livestock and other supplies, and supervising the loading of victuals onto ships bound for the British colonies. Michael Rice died in 1785, and this business passed to Edmund.

He was an active member of a society established in the city for the relief of the poor. His favourite charity was the Sick and Indigent Roomkeepers’ Association, whose members visited the sick poor in their homes. He was also introduced to Jesuit spirituality when he joined the "Waterford group" of young men who met for prayer and reading at the "Little Chapel", now St Patrick's Catholic Church in Jenkin's Lane.

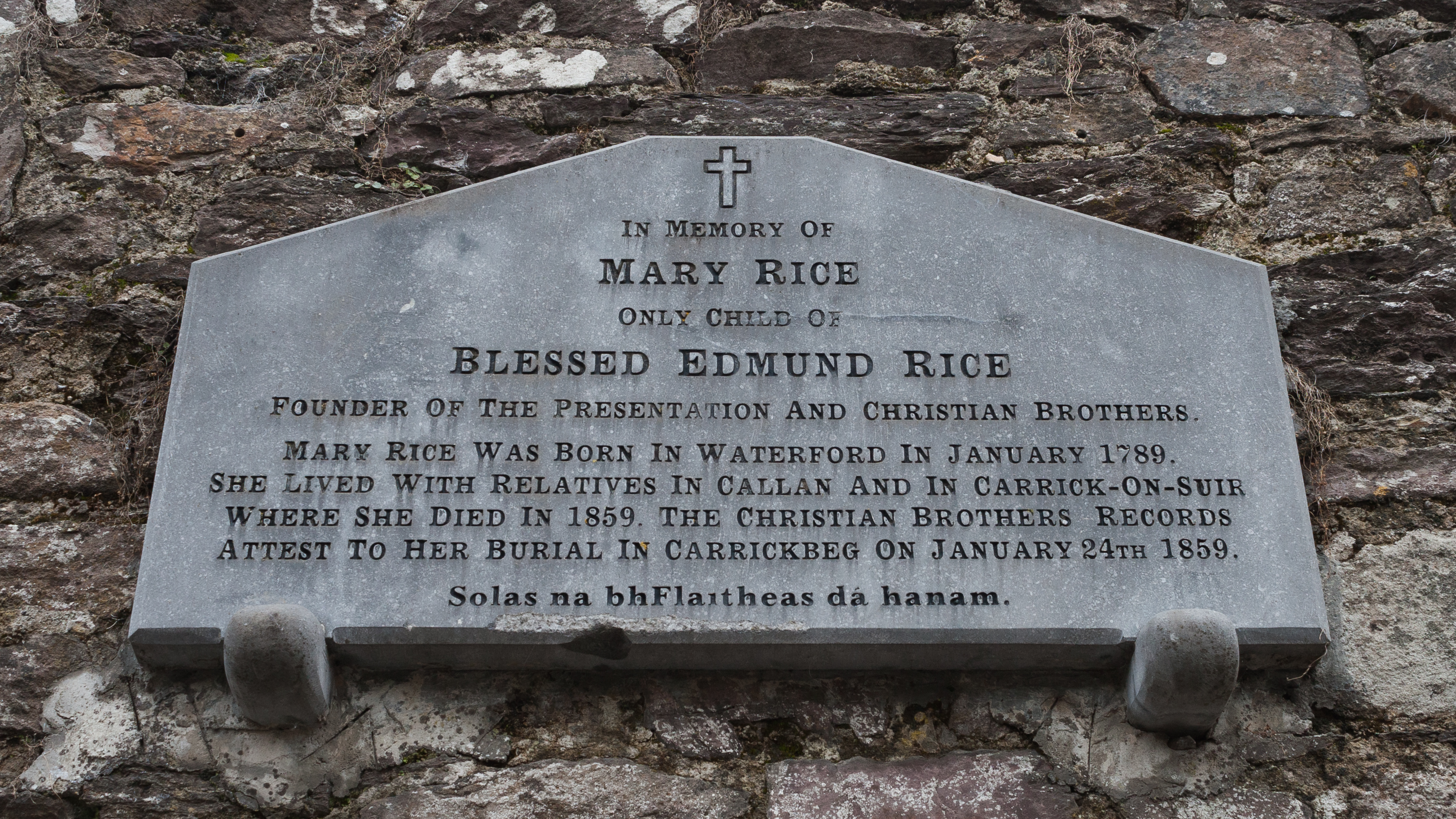
Plaque in memory of his daughter Mary at the cemetery of St. Molleran's Church, Carrickbeg

In about 1785, he married a young woman, perhaps Mary Elliott, the daughter of a Waterford tanner. Little is known about their married life. Mary died in January 1789 following an accident, possibly due to a fever that set in afterwards. Mary was pregnant at the time, and their daughter was born on her deathbed. Also named Mary, she was born handicapped. Edmund Rice was left a widower, with an infant daughter in delicate health.

== Vocation and early developments ==
Following his wife's death, he began discerning a vocation to join a monastery, perhaps in France. One day, while discussing his vocation with the sister of Thomas Hussey, the Bishop of Waterford, a band of ragged boys passed by. Pointing to them, she cried:

"What! Would you bury yourself in a cell on the continent rather than devote your wealth and your life to the spiritual and material interest of these poor youths?"

After settling his business affairs in 1802, Rice devoted his life to prayer and charitable work, particularly with the poor and marginalised of Waterford. In 1802, when he established a makeshift school in a converted stable in New Street, Waterford, he found the children were so difficult to manage that the teachers resigned. That prompted him to sell his thriving business to another prominent Catholic merchant, a Mr Quan, and devote himself to training teachers who would dedicate their lives to prayers and to teaching the children free of charge. Despite the difficulties involved, Edmund's classes were so popular that another temporary school had to be set up on another of his properties, this time in nearby Stephen Street.

The turning point of Rice's ministry was the arrival of two young men, Thomas Grosvenor and Patrick Finn, from his hometown of Callan. They came to him with the desire to join a congregation, but had not decided which they would join. As it turned out, they remained to teach at Edmund Rice's school and formed their own. The subsequent success of the New Street school led to a more permanent building, named "Mount Sion", on which construction began on 1 June 1802.

The Mount Sion monastery was blessed by Bishop Hussey on 7 June 1803. Since the schoolhouse was not yet completed, Rice, Finn, and Grosvenor took up residence, and walked each day from Mount Sion to their schools on New Street and Stephen Street. On 1 May 1804, the adjoining school was opened and blessed by Hussey's successor, Bishop John Power. Their pupils transferred to the new building.

Thanks to the appeals of some of Rice's more influential friends, a request made to the local Church of Ireland bishop for a school licence was eventually granted. By 1806, schools were established in Waterford, Carrick-on-Suir, and Dungarvan.

== Foundation of the Christian Brothers and Presentation Brothers ==
In 1808, seven of the staff including Edmund Rice took religious vows under the authority of Bishop Power of Waterford. Following the example of Nano Nagle's Presentation Sisters, they were called Presentation Brothers. It was the first congregation of men to be founded in Ireland and one of the few ever founded by a layman. Gradually, a transformation took place amongst the "quay kids" of Waterford, largely attributed to Edmund and his brothers' work, who educated, clothed and fed the boys. Other bishops in Ireland supplied Edmund Rice with men, who he prepared for the religious life and a life of teaching. Subsequently, the Presentation Brothers spread throughout Ireland.

The communities were under the bishop's control in each diocese rather than Edmund Rice, which created problems when Brothers were needed to be transferred from one school to another. Rice sought approval from Pope Pius VII for the community to be made into a pontifical congregation with a Superior General, which was obtained in 1820. The Pope's brief specified that the members were to be bound by vows of obedience, chastity, poverty and perseverance, and to give themselves to the free instruction, religious and literary, of male children, especially the poor.

The heads of houses were to elect a Superior General. Rice held that office from 1822 to 1838. He was then able to move brothers across diocesan boundaries to wherever they were most needed. During that time, the institution extended to several English towns, especially in Lancashire, and the teaching instruction grew out of the primary school stage.

In the 1820s, further difficulties emerged, owing to the expansion of the society and its becoming two distinct congregations. From that time on, they were called Christian Brothers and the Presentation Brothers. The motto of the Christian Brothers was: "The Lord has given, and the Lord has taken away; blessed be the name of the Lord forever" (Job 1: 21).

In 1828, the North Richmond Street house and schools in Dublin were established by Rice. The foundation stone was laid by the politician Daniel O'Connell. The building housed the Brothers' headquarters for many years. The current residence incorporates the original house built by Rice, who lived there for several years, beginning in 1831.

== Later life and death ==
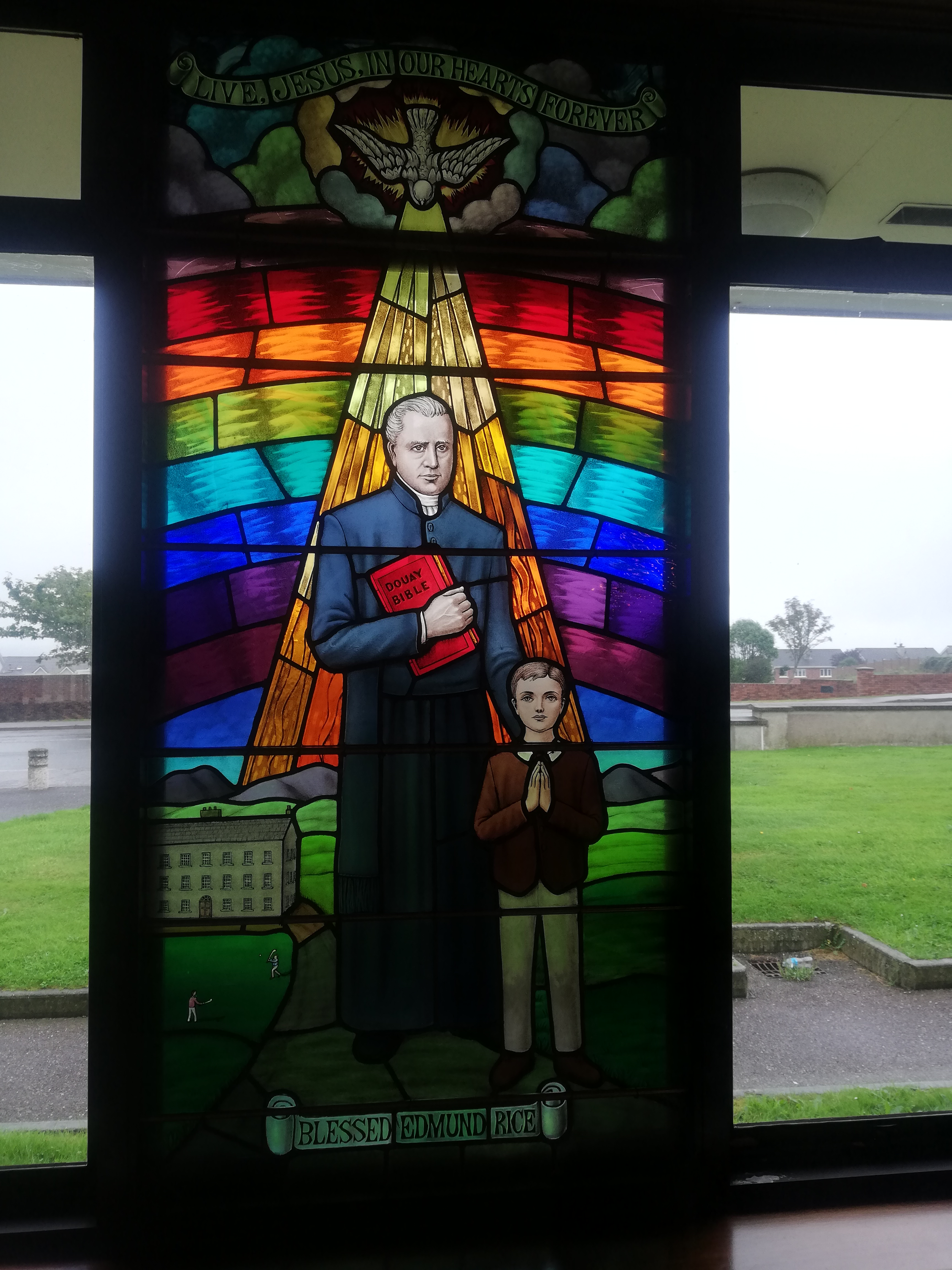
A depiction of Rice and a praying schoolboy on a stained glass window in Ireland: Rice holds a Douay Bible. In the background is a school building and two boys playing hurling

In February 1838, Edmund Rice left the North Richmond Street community and returned to Mount Sion in Waterford. Aged seventy-six, and by now in poor health, he wrote to the different communities calling for a General Chapter to elect a new Superior General. The chapter, which opened on 24 July 1838, elected Michael Paul Riordan as Rice's successor.

From that time on, Edmund Rice spent an increasing proportion of his time at Mount Sion and the adjoining school, showing a continued interest in the pupils and their teachers. He took a short walk each day on the slope of Mount Sion, but his increasingly painful arthritis led the community superior, Joseph Murphy, to purchase a wheelchair for his benefit. At Christmas time, 1841, Rice's health took a turn for the worse, and even though expectations of his imminent death did not turn out to be justified, he was increasingly confined to his room.

After living in a near-comatose state for more than two years, in the constant care of a nurse since May 1842, Rice died at 11 a.m. on 29 August 1844, at Mount Sion, Waterford, where his remains lie in a casket to this day. Large crowds filled the streets around his house in Dublin to honour him.

== Beatification and legacy ==
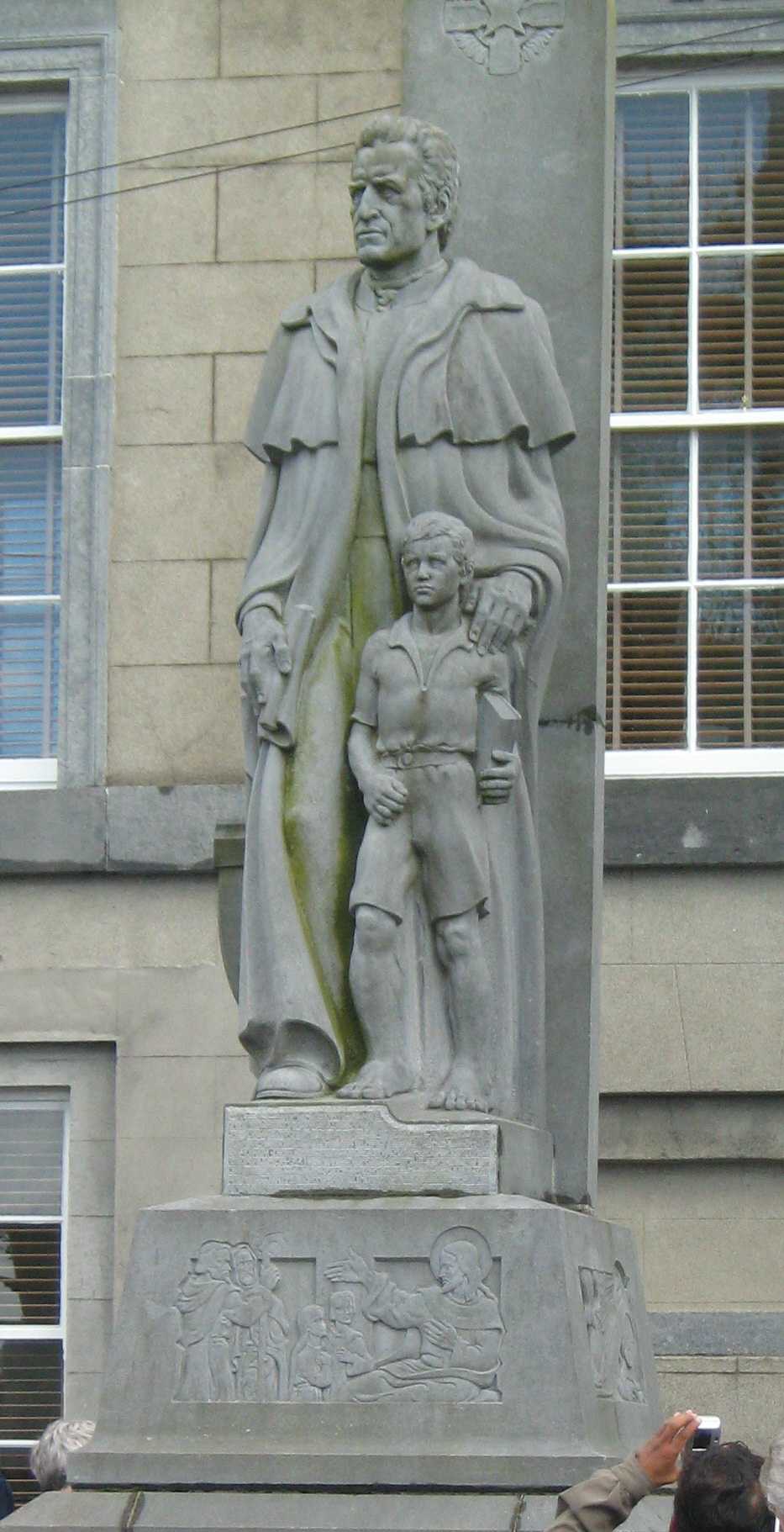
A memorial erected in Callan on Green Street, also known as Edmund Ignatius Rice Street, unveiled and blessed in July 1951

The first attempt to introduce Rice's cause to sainthood was in 1911. Mark Hill travelled Waterford and other parts of Ireland, collecting statements from people as to why they thought Rice should be made a saint, but very little progress was made. The cause was taken up by Pius Noonan, who was the superior general at the time. With the help of Giovanni Battista Montini, the future Pope Paul VI, the cause was officially opened in Dublin in 1957.

In 1976, the Historical Commission of the Dublin Archdiocese recommended that Rice's cause be brought to Rome, and the Holy See agreed to look into it. Three brothers had the burden of investigating archives and collecting evidence as to why Rice should be declared a saint: Mark Hill, David Fitzpatrick and Columba Normoyle.

As a result of these investigations and the examination in Rome of the results, on 2 April 1993, Pope John Paul II approved the pursuit of the Roman phase of the cause, declaring Edmund Rice to be venerable.

In 1995, the same Pope approved a miracle attributed to Edmund Rice's intercession. The miracle occurred in 1976, when Kevin Ellison of Newry, had been given only 48 hours to live due to complications from a gangrenous colon, and an apparent lack of viable colon tissue, a conclusion reached by five doctors after hours in surgery. A family friend, Christian Brother Laserian O'Donnell, gave Ellison's parents a relic of Edmund Rice.

Many friends prayed for a miracle through the intercession of Rice, and a special Mass was offered for Ellison's recovery. Only the relic of Edmund Rice was placed at the bedside of the dying man. The man survived the 48-hour period during which he was supposed to die, and more besides. Upon investigation, surgeons discovered a considerable length of the previously undetected colon. Ellison fully recovered after a few weeks.

These events paved the way for Rice's beatification on 6 October 1996 by Pope John Paul II. His feast day is 5 May.

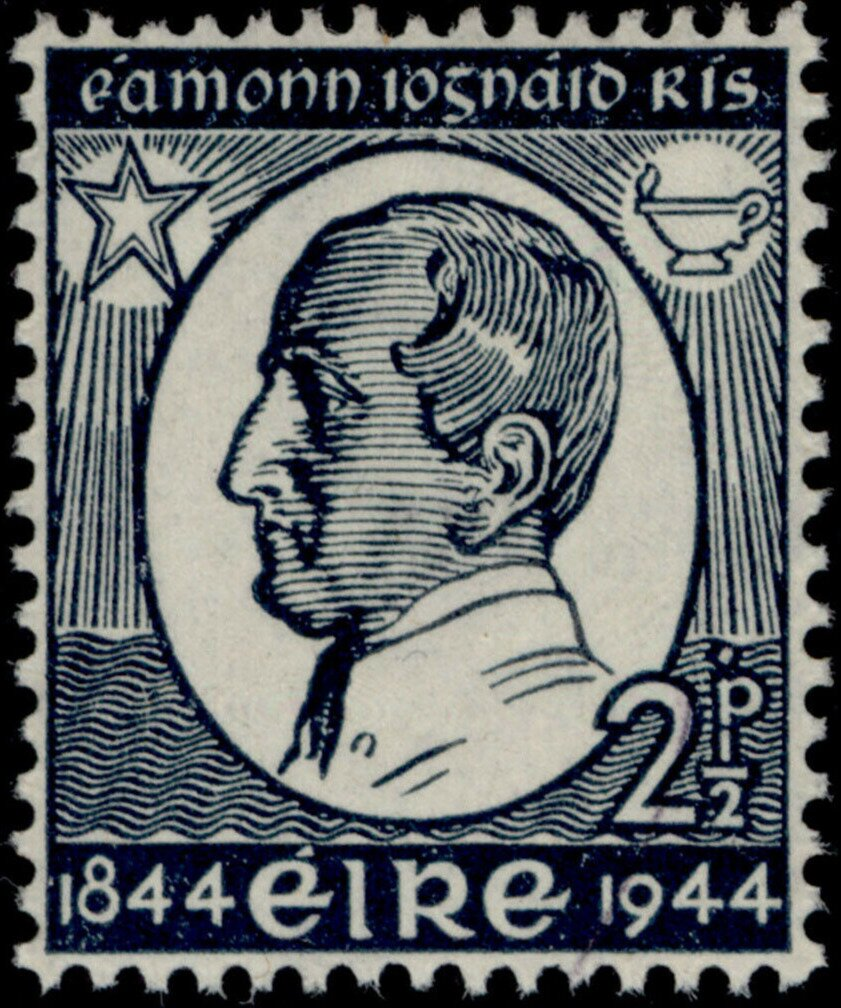
Edmund Rice postage stamp, 1944

On 29 August 1944, the Irish Department of Posts and Telegraphs released a postage stamp valued at 2½ pence, commemorating the centenary of Rice's death.

A segment of his kneecap, in a reliquary, is on display in the sports hall at St Joseph's College, Stoke-on-Trent, "part of the Edmund Rice family of schools, founded by the Christian Brothers and following the charism of Blessed Edmund Rice".

The Edmund Rice Centre is an Australian not-for-profit organisation established in 1996 that promotes human rights, social justice, and eco-justice, performing research, and using advocacy and community education to achieve its aims. It focuses especially on Indigenous Australians and other indigenous peoples, reconciliation in Australia, asylum seekers in Australia and elsewhere, and Pacific Islanders who are being affected by climate change.

== See also ==
- Edmund Rice Camps
- Edmund Ignatius Rice, patron saint archive
