= St Patrick's Catholic Church, Waterford =

Catholic church in Waterford, Ireland

Saint Patrick's Catholic Church, Waterford
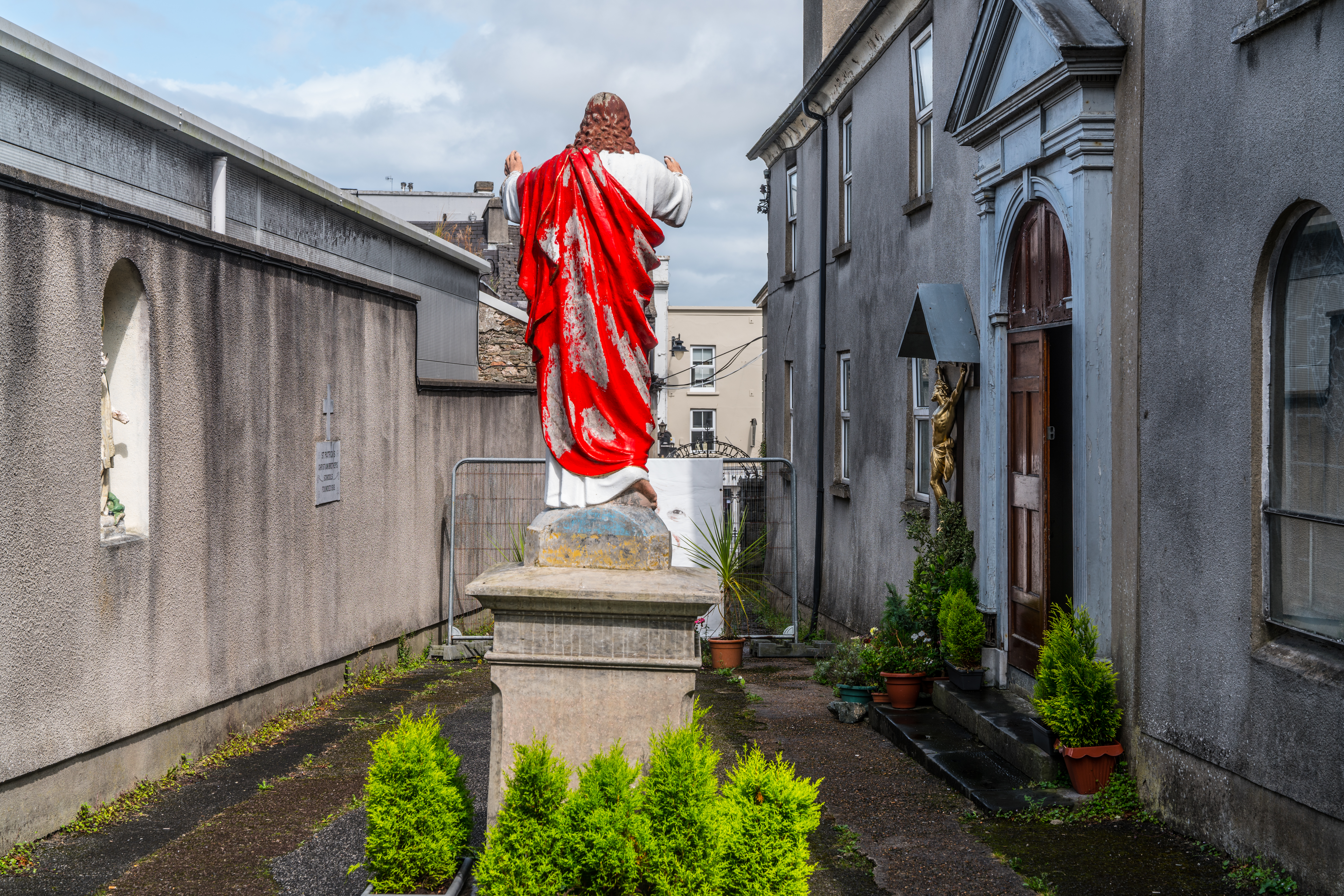
- Saint Patrick's Catholic Church, Waterford
- 52.261°N 7.113°W
- Location: Jenkin's Lane, Waterford, Ireland
- Country: Ireland
- Denomination: Roman Catholic

History
- Status: Parish church

Architecture
- Style: Neoclassical
- Completed: 1764

Administration
- Province: Cashel and Emly
- Diocese: Waterford and Lismore

St Patrick's Catholic Church is a Roman Catholic parish church in Jenkin's Lane in the city of Waterford, Ireland. It is one of the oldest surviving Irish Catholic churches to have been built after the Reformation in Ireland.

== History ==
Between the Reformation and Catholic Emancipation in 1829, Irish Catholics continued to worship in makeshift chapels or "mass houses", which were usually only tolerated by the Protestant authorities if they were built outside of city walls or boundaries. In Waterford, a slightly more tolerant attitude prevailed, perhaps reflecting the comparative wealth of the local Catholic community.

The earliest record of the site being used for Catholic worship is of the Mass being offered there in 1704. The present building was built in 1764. Edmund Ignatius Rice, the missionary and educationalist, worshipped at St Patrick's in about 1790, and joined other young men there in the "Waterford group", meeting for prayer and spiritual reading when it was known as the "Little Chapel", the "Big Chapel" later becoming the Cathedral of the Most Holy Trinity.

The chapel was extended by the addition of a chancel in about 1840 and a sacristry in 1890. The building was re-roofed in 1990, and was closed for further renovation including a new access path in 2019, being reopened by Alphonsus Cullinan, the Bishop of Waterford and Lismore in September of that year.

The National Inventory of Architectural Heritage rates St Patrick's as being of "national" importance and describes it as "one of the earliest-surviving post-Reformation churches in Ireland", while the local diocesan website says it is the "oldest Catholic Church in Ireland".

== Description ==
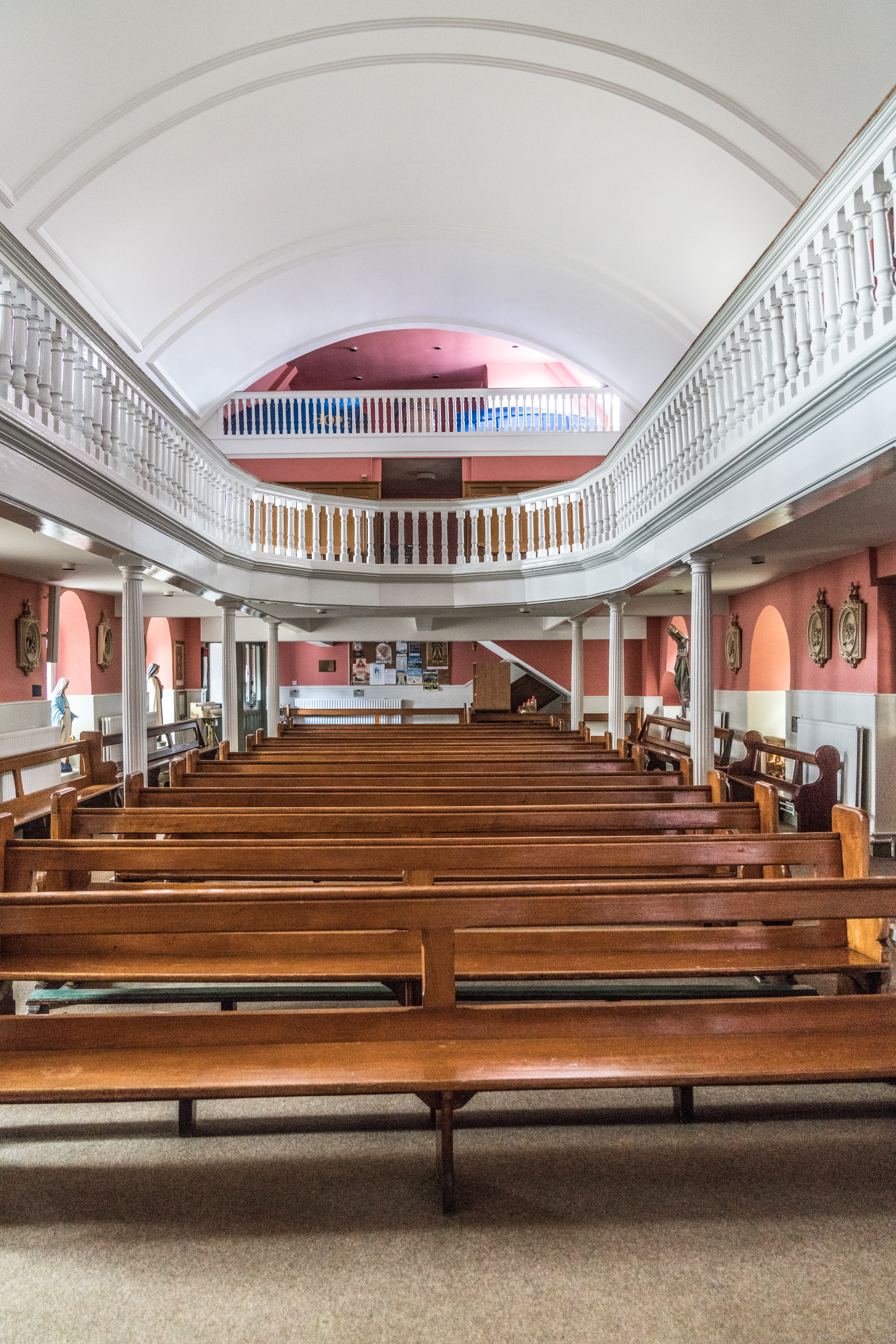
Interior view, 2017

The exterior is unremarkable with cement-rendered walls and artificial slates dating from the 1990 restoration.The exception is the round-headed main door, which is in a portico with fluted pillasters, a pediment and moulded archivolt, dated to 1840. The interior has a balustraded gallery along three sides, supported on an colonnade of five bays with fluted Doric columns. The chancel has a neo-classical reredos with fluted pilasters and a broken pediment. The barrel vaulted ceiling rests on a moulded cornice.
