= Michael Paul Riordan =

Brother Michael Paul Riordan, CFC

2nd Superior General of the Congregation of Christian Brothers
- In office July 1838 – February 1862
- Preceded by: Edmund Ignatius Rice, CFC
- Succeeded by: James Aloysius Hoare, CFC

Personal details
- Born: Michael Riordan; 1789 Clonmel, County Tipperary, Ireland
- Died: February 1862 (aged 72–73) Ireland
- Resting place: Christian Brothers Cemetery, Dublin, Ireland

Michael Paul Riordan, CFC (1789 – February 1862) was an early Christian Brother, and the second Superior General of this congregation from July 1838 until his death in 1862. He succeeded Edmund Ignatius Rice, the founder of the Christian Brothers, to this role.

== Early life ==
Riordan was born in Clonmel, County Tipperary in 1789, and unlike many Catholics at the time, was fortunate enough to gain an education at the local school. As a young man he found work in Cork as a counting-house clerk. Having acquired a knowledge of Continental languages, his work sent him on trips to France and Spain.

== Life at the North Monastery ==
Riordan joined the Christian Brothers in Cork in 1822 as part of the 'North Monastery' community. He spent the next sixteen years in the North Monastery community. He was one of the first brothers who worked down on the Cork quays.

== Superior-General ==
Edmund Rice, by 1838 aged 76 and in poor health, decided to step down from the superior-generalship. He wrote to the different communities calling for a General Chapter to elect a new superior-general. The Chapter, which opened on 24 July 1838, resulted in the election of Br. Paul Riordan as Rice's successor. This election was tightly contested and ultimately resolved in a way that put into question the validity of the voting.

=== The first Australian founding ===
At the request of Bishop John Polding of Sydney, Riordan sent Brothers Stephen Carroll, Peter Scannell and Francis Larkin to establish a community in Australia. Despite developing a good reputation amongst the locals, this mission failed in March 1847; the Brothers were not to return to Australia's shores until 1868.

=== Expansion of the Educational missions ===
In contrast, Riordan's tenure as superior-general saw a great expansion of the Brothers' educational structure in Ireland.

=== Corporal punishment ===
Another issue that Riordan had to deal with was that of increasing corporal punishment in the Brothers' schools.

Riordan died in February 1862. Brother James Aloysius Hoare succeeded Riordan as superior-general.

== Riordan and Edmund Rice ==
Riordan is best remembered for his opposition to his congregation's founder, Brother Edmund Ignatius Rice. Several points of contention have been identified to explain their rivalry. Riordan's disdain for Rice was only comparable to fellow North Monastery Brother Joseph Leonard, and he has been described as Rice's "staunchest critic".

== Bibliography ==
- Dáire Keogh, Edmund Rice, 1762-1844 (Four Courts Press: Blackrock, Ireland, 1996)
- M.C. Normoyle, A Tree is Planted: The Life and Times of Edmund Rice (Congregation of Christian Brothers: n.l., 1976)
