= Mount Sion Primary School =

- Waterford, Ireland

Information
- School type: Primary school
- Motto: Education for Life
- Religious affiliations: Roman Catholic, Christian Brothers
- Established: 1802
- Website: http://www.mountsionprimaryschool.ie/

Mount Sion Primary School (Irish: Cnoc Síon) is a school in Waterford City, Ireland, founded by Edmund Ignatius Rice in 1802. The school is Edmund Rice's premier school, being the focus point of study in many other Christian Brother schools. The school site is an international visitor centre as it is the site where the Christian Brothers and Presentation Brothers began their mission over 200 years ago.
