= James Aloysius Hoare =

Brother James Aloysius Hoare, CFC

3rd Superior General of the Congregation of Christian Brothers
- In office 1862–1880
- Preceded by: Michael Paul Riordan, CFC
- Succeeded by: Anthony Maxwell, CFC

Personal details
- Born: James Hoare; 1813 Ireland
- Died: 1902 (aged 88–89) Ireland
- Resting place: Christian Brothers Cemetery, Dublin, Ireland

James Aloysius Hoare, CFC (1813 - 1902 was the third Superior General of the Congregation of Christian Brothers. He succeeded Michael Paul Riordan to the position in 1862. He stepped down in 1880 and was succeeded by Anthony Maxwell.

== Death ==
Hoare died in 1902, and is buried in the Christian Brothers Cemetery in Marino, Dublin, Ireland.
