= Liam Ó hAnluain =

Irish educator (1910–1992)

Liam Ó hAnluain (1910–1992) was an Irish Christian Brother, schoolteacher, educator, and Irish language scholar.

== Life ==
Born in Derry city in 1910, educated locally in Riverside, then in Bunapobail, Co. Donegal.

He trained as a Christian brother in St. Joseph's, Baldoyle, completing his secondary education, and as a National School teacher in Colaiste Mhuire/St. Mary's College in Marino. While working as a teacher in North Abbey, Cork, he earned a BSc followed by a BA, and H.Dip in Education, and finally an MSc from University College Cork.

He worked in the teacher training college of St. Mary's Marino, teacher.

He served as provincial of the Christian Brothers in Ireland before stepping down due to ill health. He was tasked with writing a standard format for the grammar of the Irish language used in the Christian brothers schools.

== Publications ==
- Graiméar Gaeilge na mBráithre Críostaí by Liam Ó hAnluain, An Gúm, M.H. Mac an Ghoill agus a Mhac Teo. BAC, 1960.
