= Recency bias =

Cognitive bias that favors recent events over earlier ones

Recency bias is a cognitive bias that favors recent events over historic ones. A type of memory bias, recency bias gives "greater importance to the most recent event".

In psychology, primacy bias (excessive focus on earliest events or facts) and recency bias (excessive focus on the most recent events or facts) are often considered together as primacy and recency bias.

Recency bias should not be confused with anchoring or confirmation bias. Recency bias is related to the serial-position effect known as the recency effect. It is not to be confused with recency illusion, the belief or impression that a word or language usage is of recent origin when in reality it is long-established.

== Examples ==
=== Employment ===
Recency bias commonly appears in employee evaluations, as a distortion in favor of recently completed activities or recollections, and can be reinforced or offset by the halo effect.

=== Investment ===
Recency bias can skew investors into not accurately evaluating economic cycles, causing them to continue to remain invested in a growing market even when they should grow cautious of its potential continuation, and refrain from buying assets in a declining market or recession period because they remain pessimistic about its prospects of recovery.

When it comes to investing, recency bias often manifests in terms of direction or momentum. It convinces us that a rising market or individual stock will continue to appreciate, or that a declining market or stock is likely to keep falling. This bias often leads us to make emotionally charged choices—decisions that could erode our earning potential by tempting us to hold a stock for too long or pull out too soon.

=== Competitions ===
Lists of superlatives such as "Top 10 Superbowls", Greatest of All Time (G.O.A.T.), and sports awards (such as MVP trophies, Rookie of the Year, etc.) all are prone to distortion due to recency bias. Sports betting is also impacted by recency bias.

Since at least 2008, reporters have frequently used the term "the pimp spot" to refer to the last slot in competitions such as American Idol, X-Factor, So You Think You Can Dance, American Song Contest, The Voice, and Dancing with the Stars and sometimes in conjunction with benefits of starting last. There is empirical evidence in academic literature suggesting that participants who performed later in major song contests, including Eurovision and New Wave (when the order of performances was randomized), were ranked higher.

== See also ==
- Anchoring – Tendency to base judgments on an irrelevant anchor
- Free recall – Memory paradigm
- Henry Molaison – American memory disorder patient
- Law of primacy in persuasion – Psychological hypothesis
- Learning curve – Relationship between proficiency and experience
- List of cognitive biases
- Nostalgia – Sentimental longing for the past
- Outcome primacy – Psychological phenomenon
- Peak–end rule – Psychological heuristic
- Principles of learning – Conditions of effective learning
- Reminiscence bump – Memory phenomenon related to human aging
