= Law of primacy =

Law of primacy may refer to:

- In advertising, the law of primacy in persuasion first described by Frederick Hansen Lund in 1925.
- In educational psychology, primacy as one of the principles of learning.
