= Recall (memory) =

Retrieval of events or information from the past

Recall in human memory refers to the mental process of retrieving information from the past. Along with encoding and storage, it is one of the three core processes of memory. There are three main types of recall: free recall, cued recall and serial recall. Psychologists test these forms of recall as a way to study the memory processes of humans and animals. Two main theories of the process of recall are the two-stage theory and the theory of encoding specificity.

== Theories ==
=== Two-stage theory ===
The two-stage theory states that the process of recall begins with a search and retrieval process, and then a decision or recognition process where the correct information is chosen from what has been retrieved. In this theory, recognition only involves the latter of these two stages, or processes, and this is thought to account for the superiority of the recognition process over recall. Recognition only involves one process in which error or failure may occur, while recall involves two. However, recall has been found to be superior to recognition in some cases, such as a failure to recognize words that can later be recalled.

Another two stage theory holds that free recall of a list of items begins with the content in working memory and then moves to an associative search.

=== Encoding specificity ===
The theory of encoding specificity finds similarities between the process of recognition and that of recall. The encoding specificity principle states that memory utilizes information from the memory trace, or the situation in which it was learned, and from the environment in which it is retrieved. In other words, memory is improved when information available at encoding is also available at retrieval. For example, if one is to learn about a topic and study it in a specific location, but take their exam in a different setting, they would not have had as much of a successful memory recall as if they were in the location that they learned and studied the topic in. Encoding specificity helps to take into account context cues because of its focus on the retrieval environment, and it also accounts for the fact recognition may not always be superior to recall.

== History ==
Philosophical questions regarding how people acquire knowledge about their world spurred the study of memory and learning. Recall is a major part of memory so the history of the study of memory in general also provides a history of the study of recall.

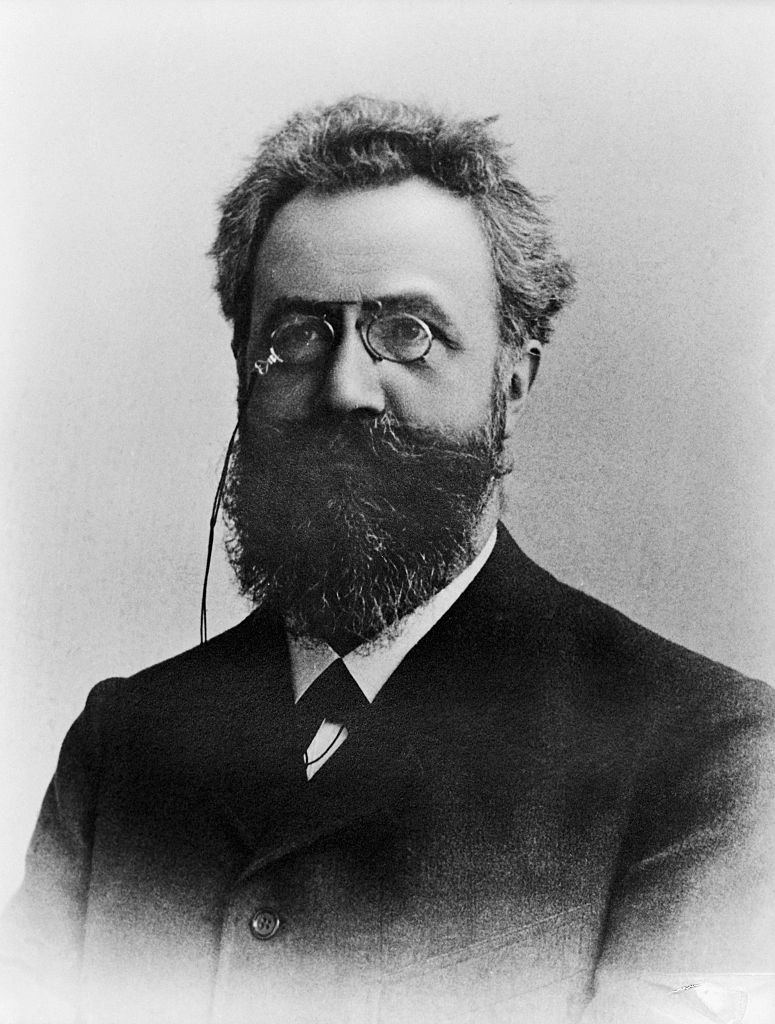
Hermann Ebbinghaus

In 1885, Hermann Ebbinghaus created nonsense syllables, combinations of letters that do not follow grammatical rules and have no meaning, to test his own memory. He would memorize a list of nonsense syllables and then test his recall of that list over varying time periods. He discovered that memory loss occurred rapidly over the first few hours or days, but showed a more steady, gradual decline over subsequent days, weeks, and months. Furthermore, Ebbinghaus discovered that multiple learning, over-learning, and spacing study times increased retention of information. Ebbinghaus' research influenced much of the research conducted on memory and recall throughout the twentieth century.

Frederic Bartlett was a prominent researcher in the field of memory during the mid-twentieth century. He was a British experimental psychologist who focused on the mistakes people made when recalling new information. One of his well-known works was Remembering: A Study in Experimental and Social Psychology, which he published in 1932. He is well known for his use of North American Native folk tales, including The War of the Ghosts. He would provide participants in his study with an excerpt from a story and then asked them to recall it as accurately as they could. Retention intervals would vary from directly after reading the story to days later. Bartlett found that people try to understand the overall meaning of the story. Since the folk tale included supernatural elements, people would rationalize them to make them fit better with their own culture. Ultimately, Bartlett argued that the mistakes that the participants made could be attributed to "schematic intrusions" - current knowledge interfering with recall.

In the 1950s there was a change in the overall study of memory that has come to be known as the cognitive revolution. This included new theories on how to view memory, often likening it to a computer processing model. Two important books influenced the revolution: Plans and Structures of Behavior by George Miller, Eugene Galanter, and Karl H. Pribram in 1960 and Cognitive Psychology by Ulric Neisser in 1967. Both provided arguments for an information-processing view of the human mind. Allen Newell and Herbert A. Simon constructed computer programs that simulated the thought processes people go through when solving different kinds of problems.

In the 1960s, interest in short-term memory (STM) increased. Before the 1960s, there was very little research that studied the workings of short-term memory and rapid memory loss. Lloyd and Margaret Peterson observed that when people are given a short list of words or letters and then are distracted and occupied with another task for few seconds, their memory for the list is greatly decreased. Atkinson and Shiffrin (1973) created the short-term memory model, which became the popular model for studying short-term memory.

The next major development in the study of memory recall was Endel Tulving's proposition of two kinds of memory: episodic and semantic. Tulving described episodic memory as a memory about a specific event that occurred at a particular time and place, for example what you got for your 10th birthday. Semantic memories are abstract words, concepts, and rules stored in long-term memory. Furthermore, Endel Tulving devised the encoding specificity principle in 1983, which explains the importance of the relation between the encoding of information and then recalling that information. To explain further, the encoding specificity principle means that a person is more likely to recall information if the recall cues match or are similar to the encoding cues.

The 1960s also saw a development in the study of visual imagery and how it is recalled. This research was led by Allan Paivio, who found that the more image-arousing a word was the more likely it would be recalled in either free recall or paired associates.

There has been a considerable amount of research into the workings of memory, and specifically recall since the 1980s. The previously mentioned research was developed and improved upon, and new research was and still is being conducted.

== Types ==
=== Free recall ===
Free recall describes the process in which a person is given a list of items to remember and then is tested by being asked to recall them in any order. Free recall often displays evidence of primacy and recency effects. Primacy effects are displayed when the person recalls items presented at the beginning of the list earlier and more often. The recency effect is when the person recalls items presented at the end of the list earlier and more often. Free recall often begins with the end of the list and then moves to the beginning and middle of the list.

=== Cued recall ===
Cued recall is when a person is given a list of items to remember and is then tested with cues to remember material. Researchers have used this procedure to test memory. Participants are given pairs, usually of words, A1-B1, A2-B2...An-Bn (n is the number of pairs in a list) to study. Then the experimenter gives the participant a word to cue the participant to recall the word with which it was originally paired. The word presentation can either be visual or auditory.

There are two basic experimental methods used to conduct cued recall, the study-test method and the anticipation method. In the study-test method participants study a list of word pairs presented individually. Immediately after or after a time delay, participants are tested in the study phase of the experiment on the word pairs just previously studied. One word of each pair is presented in a random order and the participant is asked to recall the item with which it was originally paired. The participant can be tested for either forward recall, Ai is presented as a cue for Bi, or backward recall, Bi is presented as a cue for Ai. In the anticipation method, participants are shown Ai and are asked to anticipate the word paired with it, Bi. If the participant cannot recall the word, the answer is revealed. During an experiment using the anticipation method, the list of words is repeated until a certain percentage of Bi words are recalled.

The learning curve for cued recall increases systematically with the number of trials completed. This result has caused a debate about whether or not learning is all-or-none. One theory is that learning is incremental and that the recall of each word pair is strengthened with repetition. Another theory suggests that learning is all-or-none, that is one learns the word pair in a single trial and memory performance is due to the average learned pairs, some of which are learned on earlier trials and some on later trials. To examine the validity of these theories researchers have performed memory experiments. In one experiment published in 1959, experimental psychologist Irvin Rock and colleague Walter Heimer of the University of Illinois had both a control group and an experimental group learn pairs of words. The control group studied word pairs that were repeated until the participants learned all the word pairs. In the experimental group, the learned pairs remained in the list while unlearned pairs were substituted with recombinations of previous words. Rock believed that associations between two items would be strengthened if learning were incremental even when pairs are not correctly recalled. His hypothesis was that the control group would have a higher correct recall probability than the experimental group. He thought that repetition would increase the strength of the word pair until the strength reaches a threshold needed to produce an overt response. If learning were all or none, then the control group and the experimental group should learn the word pairs at the same rate. Rock found experimentally there was little difference in learning rates between the two groups.

However, Rock's work did not settle the controversy because in his experiment he rearranged replaced word pairs that could be either easier or harder to learn than the original words in the word- digit pair. In further experiments that addressed the question, there were mixed results. The incremental learning hypothesis is supported by the notion that awhile after Ai-Bi pairs are learned, the recall time to recall Bi decreases with continued learning trails.

Another theory that can be tested using cued recall is symmetry of forward and backward recall. Forward recall is generally assumed to be easier than backward recall, i.e. forward recall is stronger than backward recall. This is generally true for long sequences of word or letters such as the alphabet. In one view, the independent associations hypothesis, the strength of forward and backward recall are hypothesized to be independent of each other. In another view, the associative symmetry hypothesis, the strengths of forward and backward recall are about equal and highly correlated. In S.E Asch from Swarthmore College and S. M Ebenholtz's experiment, participants learned pairs of nonsense syllables by anticipation recall. After reaching a certain threshold of learning, the participants were tested by free recall to determine all pairs and single items they could remember. These researchers found that backward association was greatly weaker than forward association. However, when the availability of forward and backward recall were basically the same, there was little difference between forward and backward recall. Some scientists including Asch and Ebenholtz believe in the independent association hypothesis think that the equal strengths of forward and backward recall are compatible with their hypothesis because forward and backward recall could be independent but with equal strengths. However associative symmetry theorists interpreted the data to mean that the results fit their hypothesis.

Another study done using cued recall found that learning occurs during test trials. Mark Carrier and Pashler (1992) found that the group with a study-only phase makes 10% more errors than the group with a test-study phase. In the study-only phase, participants were given Ai-Bi, where Ai was an English word and Bi was a Siberian Yupik word. In the test study phase, participants first attempted to recall Bi given Ai as a cue then they were shown Ai-Bi pair together. This result suggests that after participants learn something, testing their memory with mental operations helps later recall. The act of recalling instead of restudying creates new and longer lasting connection between Ai and Bi. This phenomenon is commonly referred to as the testing effect.

Another study showed that when lists are tested immediately after study, the last couple of pairs are remembered best. After a five-second delay, the recall of recently studied words diminishes. However, word pairs at the beginning of a list still show better recall. Moreover, in a longer list, the absolute number of word pairs recalled is greater but in a shorter list of word pairs, the percentage of word pairs recalled is greater.

Sometimes, when recalling word pairs, there is an intrusion. An intrusion is an error that participants make when they attempt to recall a word based on a cue of that word pair. Intrusions tend to have either semantic attributes in common with the correct word not recalled or have been previously studied in another word pair on the current list or a previously studied list or were close in time to the cue item. When two items are similar, an intrusion may occur. Professor Kahana and Marieke Vugt at the University of Pennsylvania examined the effects of face similarity for face-name associations. In the first experiment, they wanted to determine if performance of recall would vary with the number of faces in the study set that were similar to the cue face. Faces were similar if the radius of the faces were within a range. The number of faces within a radius is called a neighborhood density. They found that the recall of a name to face exhibited a lower accuracy and slower reaction time for faces with a greater neighborhood density. The more similarity that two faces have, the greater the probability for interference between the two faces. When cued with face A, name B may be recalled if face A and B are similar, which would signify that an intrusion has occurred. The probability of correct recall came from the number of faces that had other similar faces.

Cues act as guides to what the person is supposed to remember. A cue can be virtually anything that may act as a reminder, e.g. a smell, song, color, place etc. In contrast to free recall, the subject is prompted to remember a certain item on the list or remember the list in a certain order. Cued recall also plays into free recall because when cues are provided to a subject, they will remember items on the list that they did not originally recall without a cue. Tulving explained this phenomenon in his research. When he gave participants associative cues to items that they did not originally recall and that were thought to be lost to memory, the participants were able to recall the item.

=== Serial recall ===
Serial recall is the ability to recall items or events in the order in which they occurred. The ability of humans to store items in memory and recall them is important to the use of language. Imagine recalling the different parts of a sentence, but in the wrong order. The ability to recall in serial order has been found not only in humans, but in a number of non-human primate species and some non-primates. Imagine mixing up the order of phonemes, or meaningful units of sound, in a word so that "slight" becomes "style." Serial-order also helps us remember the order of events in our lives, our autobiographical memories. Our memory of our past appears to exist on a continuum on which more recent events are more easily remembered in order.

Serial recall in long-term memory (LTM) differs from serial recall in short-term memory (STM). To store a sequence in LTM, the sequence is repeated over time until it is represented in memory as a whole, rather than as a series of items. In this way, there is no need to remember the relationships between the items and their original positions. In STM, immediate serial recall (ISR) has been thought to result from one of two mechanisms. The first refers to ISR as a result of associations between the items and their positions in a sequence, while the second refers to associations between items. These associations between items are referred to as chaining, and is an unlikely mechanism, according to research. Position-item relationships do not account for recency and primacy effects, or the phonological similarity effect. The Primacy Model moves away from these two assumptions, suggesting that ISR results from a gradient of activation levels where each item has a particular level of activation that corresponds to its position. Research has supported the fact that immediate serial-recall performance is much better when the list is homogenous (of the same semantic category) than when they are heterogeneous (of different semantic category). This suggests that semantic representations are beneficial to immediate serial-recall performance. Short-term serial recall is also affected by similar-sounding items, as recall is lower (remembered more poorly) than items that do not sound alike. This is true when lists are tested independently (when comparing two separate lists of similar-sounding and not similar-sounding items) as well as when tested using a mixed list. Alan Baddeley first reported such an experiment in which items within a list were either mutually dissimilar or highly similar.

There is evidence indicating that rhythm is highly sensitive to competing motor production. Actions such as paced finger tapping can have an effect on recall as the disruptive impact of paced finger tapping, but lack of consistent effect of paced irrelevant sound, is indicative of motor feedback from the tapping task disrupting rehearsal and storage.

Eight different effects are generally seen in serial-recall studies with humans:

1. List length effect
Serial-recall ability decreases as the length of the list or sequence increases.

2. Primacy and recency effects
Primacy effects refer to better recall of items earlier in the sequence, while recency effects refer to better recall of the last few items. Recency effects are seen more with auditory stimuli rather than verbal stimuli as auditory presentation seems to protect the end of lists from output interference.

3. Transposition gradients
Transposition gradients refer to the fact that recall tends to be better to recognize what an item is rather than the order of items in a sequence.

4. Item confusion errors
When an item is incorrectly recalled, there is a tendency to respond with an item that resembles the original item in that position.

5. Repetition errors
These occur during the recall of a sequence when an item from an earlier position in the sequence is given again in another position. This effect is fairly rare in humans.

6. Fill-in effects
If an item is recalled incorrectly at an earlier position than its original place, there is a tendency for the next item recalled to be the item that was displaced by this error. For example, if the sequence is '1234' and recall began '124', then the next item is likely to be '3'.

7. Protrusion effects
These occur when an item from a previous list or test is accidentally recalled on a new list or test. This item is likely to be recalled at its position from the original trial.

8. Word-length effects
Short words are recalled more accurately than longer words.

== Neuroanatomy ==
The anterior cingulate cortex, globus pallidus, thalamus, and cerebellum show higher activation during recall than during recognition which suggests that these components of the cerebello-frontal pathway play a role in recall processes that they do not in recognition. Although recall and recognition are considered separate processes, they are both most likely constitute components of distributed networks of brain regions.

Cerebellum highlighted in red

Globus pallidus highlighted in red

According to neuroimaging data, PET studies on recall and recognition have consistently found increases in regional cerebral blood flow (RCBF) in the following six brain regions: (1) the prefrontal cortex, particularly on the right hemisphere; (2) the hippocampal and parahippocampal regions of the medial temporal lobe; (3) the anterior cingulate cortex; (4) the posterior midline area that includes posterior cingulate, retrosplenial (see retrosplenial region), precuneus, and cuneus regions; (5) the inferior parietal cortex, especially on the right hemisphere; and (6) the cerebellum, particularly on the left.

Hippocampus highlighted in red

The specific role of each of the six main regions in episodic retrieval is still unclear, but some ideas have been suggested. The right prefrontal cortex has been related to retrieval attempt; the medial temporal lobes to conscious recollection; the anterior cingulate to response selection; the posterior midline region to imagery; the inferior parietal to awareness of space; and the cerebellum to self-initiated retrieval .

Anterior cingulate cortex

In recent research, a group of subjects was faced with remembering a list of items and then measured when trying to recall said items. The evoked potentials and hemodynamic activity measured during encoding were found to exhibit reliable differences between subsequently recalled and not recalled items. This effect has been termed the subsequent memory effect (SME). This difference in these specific brain regions determines whether or not an item is recalled. A study by Fernandez et al. has shown that the differences that predict recall appear both as a negative deflection in the rhinal cortex of an event-related potential (ERP) 400 ms after stimulus exposure, and as a positive hippocampal ERP beginning 800 ms after stimulus onset. This means that recall only occurs if these two brain regions (rhinal cortex and hippocampus) are activated in synchrony.

== Factors that affect recall ==
=== Attention ===
The effect of attention on memory recall has surprising results. It seems that the only time attention largely affects memory is during the encoding phase. During this phase, performing a parallel task can severely impair retrieval success. It is believed that this phase requires much attention to properly encode the information at hand, and thus a distractor task does not allow proper input and reduces the amount of information learned.

One's attention to words is impacted by emotion grasping vocabulary. Negative and positive words are better recalled than neutral words that are spoken. Many different ways that attention is focused on hearing what the speaker has to say are the inflection of the presenter's voice in a sad, content, or frustrated sound or in the use of words that are close to the heart. A study was conducted to observe if the use of emotional vocabulary was a key receptor of recall memory. The groups were put into the same lecture halls and given the same speakers, but the results came back to determine that the inflection and word choice recalled by the listeners concluded that emotional words, phrases, and sounds are more memorable than neutral speakers.

Recall memory is linked with instincts and mechanisms. In order to remember how an event happened, to learn from it or avoid an agitator, connections are made with emotions. For instance, if a speaker is very calm and neutral, the effectiveness of encoding memory is very low and listeners get the gist of what the speaker is discussing. On the other hand, if a speaker is shouting and/or using emotionally driven words, listeners tend to remember key phrases and the meaning of the speech. This is full access of the fight or flight mechanism all people have functioning in the brain, but based on what triggers this mechanism will lead to better recall of it. People tend to focus their attention on cues that are loud, very soft, or something unusual. This makes the auditory system pick up the differences in regular speaking and meaningful speech, when something significant is spoken in the discussion people home in on the message at that part of the speech but tend to lose the other part of the discussion. Our brains sense differences in speech and when those differences occur the brain encodes that part of speech into memory and the information can be recalled for future reference.

=== Motivation ===
Motivation is a factor that encourages a person to perform and succeed at the task at hand. In an experiment done by Roebers, Moga and Schneider (2001), participants were placed in either forced report, free report or free report plus incentive groups. In each group, they found that the amount of correct information recalled did not differ, yet in the group where participants were given an incentive they had higher accuracy results. This means that presenting participants with an encouragement to provide correct information motivates them to be more precise. However, this is only true if the perception is that success is providing correct information. When it is believed that success is the completion of the task rather than the accuracy of that completion, the number of responses is higher, yet its accuracy is lowered. This shows that the results are dependent on how success is defined to the participant. In the referred experiment, the participants that were placed in the forced response group had the lowest overall accuracy; they had no motivation to provide accurate responses and were forced to respond even when they were unsure of the answer. Another study done by Hill RD, Storandt M, and Simeone C tested the impact of memory skills training and external reward on free recall of serial word lists. Effects similar to those reported in the previous study were seen in children—in contrast to older learners.

=== Interference ===
In the absence of interference, there are two factors at play when recalling a list of items: the recency and the primacy effects. The recency effect occurs when the short-term memory is used to remember the most recent items, and the primacy effect occurs when the long-term memory has encoded the earlier items. The recency effect can be eliminated if there is a period of interference between the input and the output of information extending longer than the holding time of short-term memory (15–30 seconds). This occurs when a person is given subsequent information to recall preceding the recall of the initial information. The primacy effect, however, is not affected by the interference of recall. The elimination of the last few items from memory is due to the displacement of these items from short-term memory, by the distracting task.

As they have not been recited and rehearsed, they are not moved into long-term memory and are thus lost. A task as simple as counting backwards can change memory recall; however an empty delay interval has no effect. This is because the person can continue to rehearse the items in their working memory to be remembered without interference. Cohen (1989) found that there is better recall for an action in the presence of interference if that action is physically performed during the encoding phase. It has also been found that recalling some items can interfere and inhibit the recall of other items. Another stream of thought and evidence suggests that the effects of interference on recency and primacy are relative, determined by the ratio rule (retention interval to inter item presentation distractor rate) and they exhibit time-scale invariance.

=== Context ===
Context-dependency effects on recall are typically interpreted as evidence that the characteristics of the environment are encoded as part of the memory trace and can be used to enhance retrieval of the other information in the trace. In other words, you can recall more when the environments are similar in both the learning and recall phases. Context cues appear to be important in the retrieval of newly learned meaningful information. In a classic study by Godden and Baddeley (1975), using free recall of wordlist demonstrated that deep-sea divers had better recall when there was a match between the learning and recalling environment. Lists learned underwater were recalled best underwater and lists learned on land were recalled best on land." An academic application would be that students may perform better on exams by studying in silence, because exams are usually done in silence.

=== State-dependent memory ===
State-dependent retrieval is demonstrated when material learned under one State is best recalled in that same state. A study by Carter and Cassady (1998) showed this effect with antihistamine. In other words, if you study while on hay fever tablets, then you will recall more of what you studied if you test yourself while on antihistamines in comparison to testing yourself while not on antihistamines after having studied on antihistamines.

A study by Block and Ghoneim (2000) found that, relative to a matched group of healthy, non-drug-using controls, heavy marijuana use is associated with small but significant impairments in memory retrieval. Cannabis induces loss of internal control and cognitive impairment, especially impairment of attention and memory, for the duration of the intoxication period.

Stimulants, such as cocaine, amphetamines or caffeine are known to improve recall in humans. However, the effect of prolonged use of stimulants on cognitive functioning is very different from the impact on one-time users. Some researchers have found stimulant use to lower recall rates in humans after prolonged usage. The axons, dendrites, and neurons wear out in many cases. Current research illustrates a paradoxical effect. The few exceptions undergo mental hypertrophy. Methylenedioxymethamphetamine (MDMA) users are found to exhibit difficulties encoding information into long-term memory, display impaired verbal learning, are more easily distracted, and are less efficient at focusing attention on complex tasks. The degree of executive impairment increases with the severity of use, and the impairments are relatively long-lasting. Chronic cocaine users display impaired attention, learning, memory, reaction time and cognitive flexibility. Whether or not stimulants have a positive or negative effect on recall depends on how much is used and for how long.

=== Gender ===
Consistently, females perform better than males on episodic memory tasks including delayed recall and recognition. However, males and females do not differ on working, immediate and semantic memory tasks. Neuro-psychological observations suggest that, in general, previous injuries cause greater deficits in females than in males. It has been proposed that the gender differences in memory performance reflect underlying differences in the strategies used to process information, rather than anatomical differences. However, gender differences in cerebral asymmetry received support from morphometric studies showing a greater leftward asymmetry in males than in females, meaning that men and women use each side of their brain to a different extent. There is also evidence for a negative recall bias in women, which means females in general are more likely than males to recall their mistakes. In an eyewitness study by Dan Yarmey in 1991, he found that women were significantly more accurate than men in accuracy of recall for weight of suspects.

Studies have tested the difference between what men and women can recall after a presentation. Three speakers were involved, one being female and two being male. Men and women were put into the same lecture hall and had the same speaker talk to them. The results suggested that information presented by the women speaker was more easily recalled by all the members of the study. Researchers believe this to be a significant difference between genders because women's voices have better acoustics, ranging from low tones to high tones. Since their voices have this range, semantic encoding is increased for the pitches that stimulate the auditory component of the brain; this resonates better in the ear function. Since pitch ranges from low tones to high tones, it draws people's attention to the words attributed with the tone. As the tone changes, words stand out and from these differences memories can be stored. Recall is made easier since the association the brain can make is between words and sounds spoken.

A distinguishing feature is how males and females process information and then recall what was presented to them. Females tend to remember nonverbal cues and associate the meaning of a discussion with gestures. Since males follow verbal cues they react more to the facts and actual words within a discussion to recall what was said, but fluctuations in the speaker's voice helps them maintain the memories. Another difference that sets males and females apart is recalling someone's voice. They tend to recall information they have read, for instance, lists of objects are better recalled for men than women. The only similarity they have is that when emotional words are used or an emotional tone is produced, males and females tend to recall those changes.

=== Food consumption ===
There has been much research on whether eating prior to a cognitive recall test can affect cognitive functioning. One example was a study of the effect of breakfast timing on selected cognitive functions of elementary school students. Their results found that children who ate breakfast at school scored notably higher on most of the cognitive tests than did students who ate breakfast at home and also children who did not eat breakfast at all.

In a study of women experiencing Premenstrual Syndrome, they were either given a placebo beverage or a carbohydrate-rich one. The patients were tested at home; their moods, cognitive performance, and food craving were measured before the consumption of the beverage and 30, 90, and 180 minutes after consumption. The results showed that the carbohydrate-rich beverage significantly decreased self-reported depression, anger, confusion, and carbohydrate craving 90 to 180 minutes after consumption. Memory word recognition also improved significantly.

=== Physical activity ===
Studies have indicated that children who are inactive have poor health, but they also have poor cognitive health also. With low fitness there is a relationship to decreased cognitive functioning; for instance there are different types of cognitive problems like perception, memory, cognitive control, and there is lower academic achievement. Many tests have been conducted to identify what exactly is the reduction when children do not have physical activity. One test selected children to be in two different groups, one group was physically active the other group was not. After a while of monitoring the children the researchers tested the children in learning and recall memory to see what they were retaining and to observe the difference if available of low physical activity versus high physical activity. The results came back indicating that the children without physical activity have a later recall process than the children with physical activity. The learning part of the experiment was equally distributed on both spectrums for each group, but recall memory was the only variable that did not match both of the groups.

Physical activity has a significant influence on the hippocampus, since this is the part of the brain that is responsible for encoding information into memory. With physical activity having such an impact on the hippocampus this can regulate other parts of the body as well like weight, memory, daily function, and many more processes that are necessary for the body to work. Since physical activity impacts all of these important parts of the brain, this form of exercise keeps the neural networks functioning well. Neural networks allow information to process and pass to the hippocampus in order to retain memory. This lets the brain be more efficient in processing and more memories are stored this way.

=== Trauma and brain exposure ===
There is barely any recalled memory in cases of fear and trauma exposure, brain injury, post-traumatic stress disorder, pain, or anxiety. Recall memory is very limited, since the only memory people with these problems have is the flash backs of what happened when the event took place. People can only recall the memory that happened on that day when they hear or see something that brings the memory into existence. They cannot recall how they felt or what they saw, but through images or audio people can recall that tragic event. For example, the day of September 11, 2001, first responders remember the day and what it was like; but the feelings they could not recall. The only way to recall the feelings they had were when sirens of police vehicles, fire trucks, and ambulances drove by their house they feel the exact feelings that were in effect on that day.

Recall memory is active when a familiar sound triggers a feeling of pain from a past event, but most of the recall is shut out from traumatic event. It is similar to classical conditioning, when a dog hears a bell it begins to react to the noise rather than an exterior variable like food or an electric shock. The use of therapy is constructed for a person with this problem to help avoid the fear associated with sounds or objects, and be able to then recall other pieces of information that happened during the event.

== Phenomena ==
The phenomenological account of recall is referred to as metacognition, or "knowing about knowing". This includes many states of conscious awareness known as feeling-of-knowing states, such as the tip-of-the-tongue state. It has been suggested that metacognition serves a self-regulatory purpose whereby the brain can observe errors in processing and actively devote resources to resolving the problem. It is considered an important aspect of cognition that can aid in the development of successful learning strategies that can also be generalized to other situations.

=== Mnemonics and cognitive strategies ===
A key technique in improving and helping recall memory is to take advantage of Mnemonic devices and other cognitive strategies. Mnemonic devices are a type of cognitive strategy that enables individuals to memorize and recall new information in an easier fashion, rather than just having to remember a list of information that is not related to one another. An example of mnemonic devices are PEMDAS or Please Excuse My Dear Aunt Sally; this is a device for arithmetic when solving equations that have parenthesis, exponents, multiplication, division, addition, or subtraction and what order to do each calculation. Words or an acronym can stand for a process that individuals need to recall. The benefits of using these types of strategies to perform tasks are that encoding becomes more organized and it is easier to remember and process information. Also this device reduces the need of intentional resources at the point of retrieval, which means that recall does not need outside sources helping an individual remember what happened yesterday. Cognitive strategies can leverage semantic connections that will allow the brain to process and work more efficiently than just having to process the information as whole parts. By using the strategies the information becomes related to each other and the information sticks.

Another type of device people use to help their recall memory become efficient is chunking. Chunking is the process of breaking down numbers into smaller units to remember the information or data, this helps recall numbers and math facts. An example of this chunking process is a telephone number; this is chunked with three digits, three digits, then four digits. People read them off as such when reciting a phone number to another person. There has been research done about these techniques and an institution tested two groups of people to see if these types of devices work well for real people, the results came back determining a significant performance difference between the group who did not use cognitive strategies and the group who did. The group using the techniques immediately performed better than the other group and when taking a pre-test and post-test the results indicated that the group using the techniques improved while the other group did not.

The Method of Loci (MOL) refers to an individual visualizing a spatial environment to improve later recall of information. Instead of merely reading a list of items, individuals mentally walk along a path, placing things that subsequently need to be remembered. This elaborate rehearsal provides the opportunity to manipulate information during the encoding process. For example, from the store, you need peanut butter, toothpaste, dog food, and laundry detergent. Instead of repeating the list, imagine yourself eating a peanut butter sandwich, afterwards walking to the bathroom to brush your teeth, then walking by your dog on the way to the laundry room. This improving recall method does not appear to be limited to merely recalling a list of items. Research demonstrated that this cognitive strategy improved student performance on assessments. Participants were divided into two groups, each receiving the same medical lectures, followed by either self-learning or using the Method of Loci. Each group was subsequently given the same assessment on the learned information and the Method of Loci group performed better, as measured by the number of correct responses.

=== Tip-of-the-tongue ===
A tip-of-the-tongue (TOT) state refers to the perception of a large gap between the identification or knowledge of a specific subject and being able to recall descriptors or names involving said subject. This phenomenon is also referred to as 'presque vu', a French term meaning "almost seen". There are two prevalent perspectives of TOT states: the psycholinguistic perspective and the metacognitive perspective.

Psycholinguistics views TOT states as a failure of retrieval from lexical memory (see Cohort Model) being cued by semantic memory (facts). Since there is an observed increase in the frequency of TOT states with age, there are two mechanisms within psycholinguistics that could account for the TOT phenomenon. The first is the degradation of lexical networks with age, where degrading connections between the priming of knowledge and vocabulary increases difficulty of successfully retrieving a word from memory. The second suggests that the culmination of knowledge, experience, and vocabulary with age results in a similar situation where many connections between a diverse vocabulary and diverse knowledge also increases the difficulty of successful retrieval of a word from memory.

The metacognitive perspective views TOT states simply as the awareness felt when such an event occurs and the perception of the experience involved. Mainly being aware of a TOT state can result in the rapid devotion of cognitive resources to resolving the state and successfully retrieving the word from memory. Such an explanation leaves much to be desired; however, the psycholinguistic perspective and the metacognitive perspective on TOT states are not mutually exclusive and both are used to observe TOT states in a laboratory setting.

An incubation effect can be observed in TOT states, where the passage of time alone can influence the resolution of the state and result in successful recall. Also, the presence of a TOT state is a good predictor that the problem can be resolved correctly, although this has been shown to occur more frequently with older-young-adults than young-adults or seniors. This is evidence for both the metacognitive perspective as well as the psycholinguistic perspective. It demonstrates the devotion of resources to searching memory, a source of cumulative information, for the desired correct information, and it also shows that we are aware of what information we know or do not know. This is why the current debate between the psycholinguistic view of TOTs as retrieval failure and the metacognitive view of TOTs as a tool for learning continues.

Similar phenomena include déjà vu (already seen), jamais vu (never Seen), and déjà entendu (already heard). These occur rarely and are more prevalent in patients with traumatic head injuries, and brain disorders including epilepsy.

=== Involuntary memory retrieval ===
Often, even after years, mental states once present in consciousness return to it with apparent spontaneity and without any act of the will; that is, they are reproduced involuntarily. Here, also, in the majority of cases we at once recognise the returned mental state as one that has already been experienced; that is, we remember it. Under certain conditions, however, this accompanying consciousness is lacking, and we know only indirectly that the "now" must be identical with the "then"; yet we receive in this way a no less valid proof for its existence during the intervening time. As more exact observation teaches us, the occurrence of these involuntary reproductions is not an entirely random and accidental one. On the contrary they are brought about through the instrumentality of other immediately present mental images. Moreover they occur in certain regular ways which in general terms are described under the so-called 'laws of association'.

— Ebbinghaus, H (1885), _{as translated by Ruger & Bussenius (1913)}

Until recently, research on this phenomenon has been relatively rare, with only two types of involuntary memory retrieval identified: involuntary autobiographical memory retrieval, and involuntary semantic memory retrieval. Both of these phenomena can be considered emergent aspects of otherwise normal and quite efficient cognitive processes.

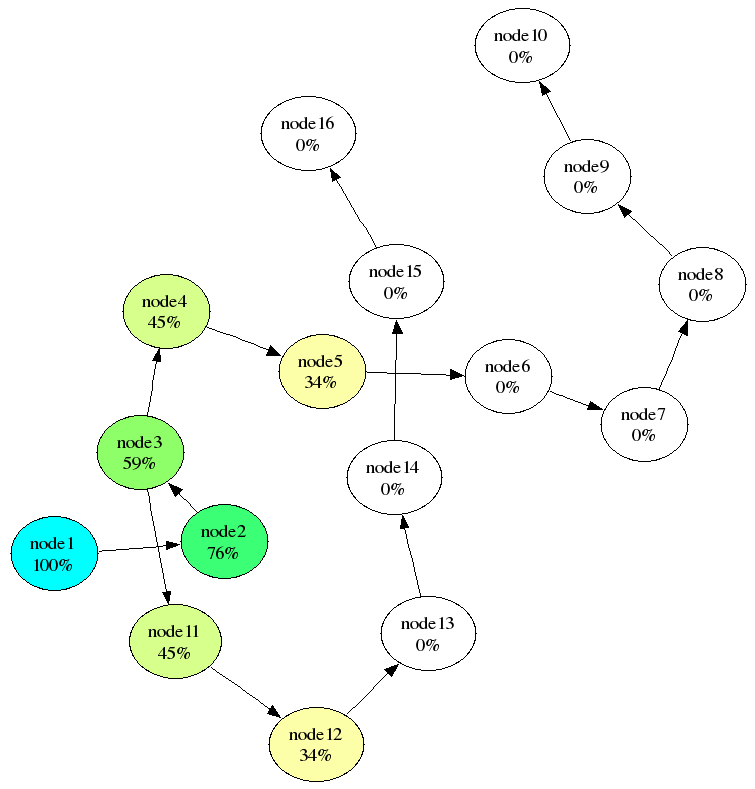
A visual representation of Spreading Activation

Involuntary autobiographical memory (IAM) retrieval occurs spontaneously as the result of sensory cues as well as internal cues, such as thought or intention. These cues influence us in our day-to-day lives by constantly and automatically activating unconscious memories through priming. It has been demonstrated in many studies that our specific goals and intentions will most frequently result in the retrieval of related IAM, while the second most frequent IAM retrievals result from physical cues in the surrounding context. Autobiographical memories that are unrelated to any specific cues, whether internal or external, are the least frequent to occur. It has been suggested that in this case, an error in self-regulation of memory has occurred that results in an unrelated autobiographical memory reaching the conscious mind. These findings are consistent with metacognition as the third type of experience is often identified as the most salient one.

Involuntary semantic memory retrieval (ISM), or "semantic-popping", occurs in the same fashion as IAM retrieval. However, the elicited memory is devoid of personal grounding and often considered trivial, such as a random word, image, or phrase. ISM retrieval can occur as a result of spreading activation, where words, thoughts, and concepts activate related semantic memories continually. When enough related memories are primed that an interrelated concept, word, thought, or image "pops" into consciousness and you are unaware of the extent of its relatedness within your memory. Spreading activation is thought to build over a period of many hours, days, or even weeks before a random semantic memory "pops".

=== False memories ===
False memories result from persistent beliefs, suggestions via authority figures, or statements of false information. Repeated exposure to these stimuli influence the reorganization of a person's memory, affecting its details, or implanting vivid false accounts of an event. This is usually accounted for by source-monitoring error, where a person can recall specific facts, but cannot correctly identify the source of that knowledge because of apparent loss of the association between the episodic (specific experience, or source) and semantic (concept-based, or gist) accounts of the stored knowledge. An example of this is cryptomnesia, or inadvertent plagiarism, where one duplicates a work that they have previously encountered believing it to be their original idea.

False memories can also be accounted for by the generation effect, which is an observable phenomenon where repeated exposure to a belief, suggestion, or false information is better remembered with each subsequent generation. This can be seen with the misinformation effect, where an eye-witness account of an event can be influenced by a bystander account of the same event, or by suggestion via an authority figure. It is also believed to influence the recovery of repressed shocking or abusive memories in patients under hypnosis, where the recovered memory, although possibly a vivid account, could be entirely false, or have specific details influenced as the result of persistent suggestion by the therapist.

=== Focal retrograde amnesia ===
Retrograde amnesia is typically the result of physical or psychological trauma which manifests itself as the inability to remember information preceding the traumatic event. It is usually accompanied by some type of anterograde amnesia, or inability to acquire new knowledge. Focal retrograde amnesia (FRA), sometimes known as functional amnesia, refers to the presence of retrograde amnesia while knowledge acquisition remains intact (no anterograde amnesia). Memory for how to use objects and perform skills (implicit memory) may remain intact while specific knowledge of personal events or previously learned facts (explicit memory) become inaccessible or lost. Amnesia can result from a number of different causes, including encephalitis, severe traumatic brain injury, vitamin B_{1} deficiency as seen in Korsakoff's Syndrome, and psychotic episodes, or by witnessing an emotionally traumatic event (Dissociative amnesia).

Dysfunction of the temporal and frontal lobes have been observed in many cases of focal retrograde amnesia, whether metabolic or the result of lesions. However, this evidence only appears to correlate with the symptoms of retrograde amnesia as cases have been observed where patients with minor concussions, showing no visible brain damage, develop FRA. It has been suggested that FRA could represent a variety of different disorders, cognitive deficits, or conditions that result in disproportionate loss of explicit memory, hence Disproportionate Retrograde Amnesia.

=== The Face Advantage ===
The Face Advantage allows information and memories to be recalled easier through the presentation of a person's face rather than a person's voice. Faces and voices are very similar stimuli that reveal similar information and result in similar processes of memory recall. During face perception, there are three stages of memory recall that include recognition, followed by the remembering of semantic memory and episodic memory, and finally name recall. The Face Advantage is shown through an experiment where participants are presented with faces and voices of unfamiliar faces and recognizable celebrity faces. The stimuli are presented with a between-group design. The participants are asked to say if the face or voice is familiar. If the answer is yes, they are asked to recall semantic and episodic memories and finally the name of the face or voice. It was much easier for those presented with a celebrity's face to recall information than for those presented with a voice. The results show that in the second stage of face perception when memories are recalled, information is recalled faster and more accurate after a face is perceived, and slower, less accurate and with less detail after a voice is perceived. A possible explanation is that the connections between face representations and semantic and episodic memory are stronger than that of voices.

== In popular culture ==
Memory phenomena are rich sources of storylines and novel situations in popular media. Two phenomena that appear regularly are total recall abilities and amnesia.

=== Total recall ===
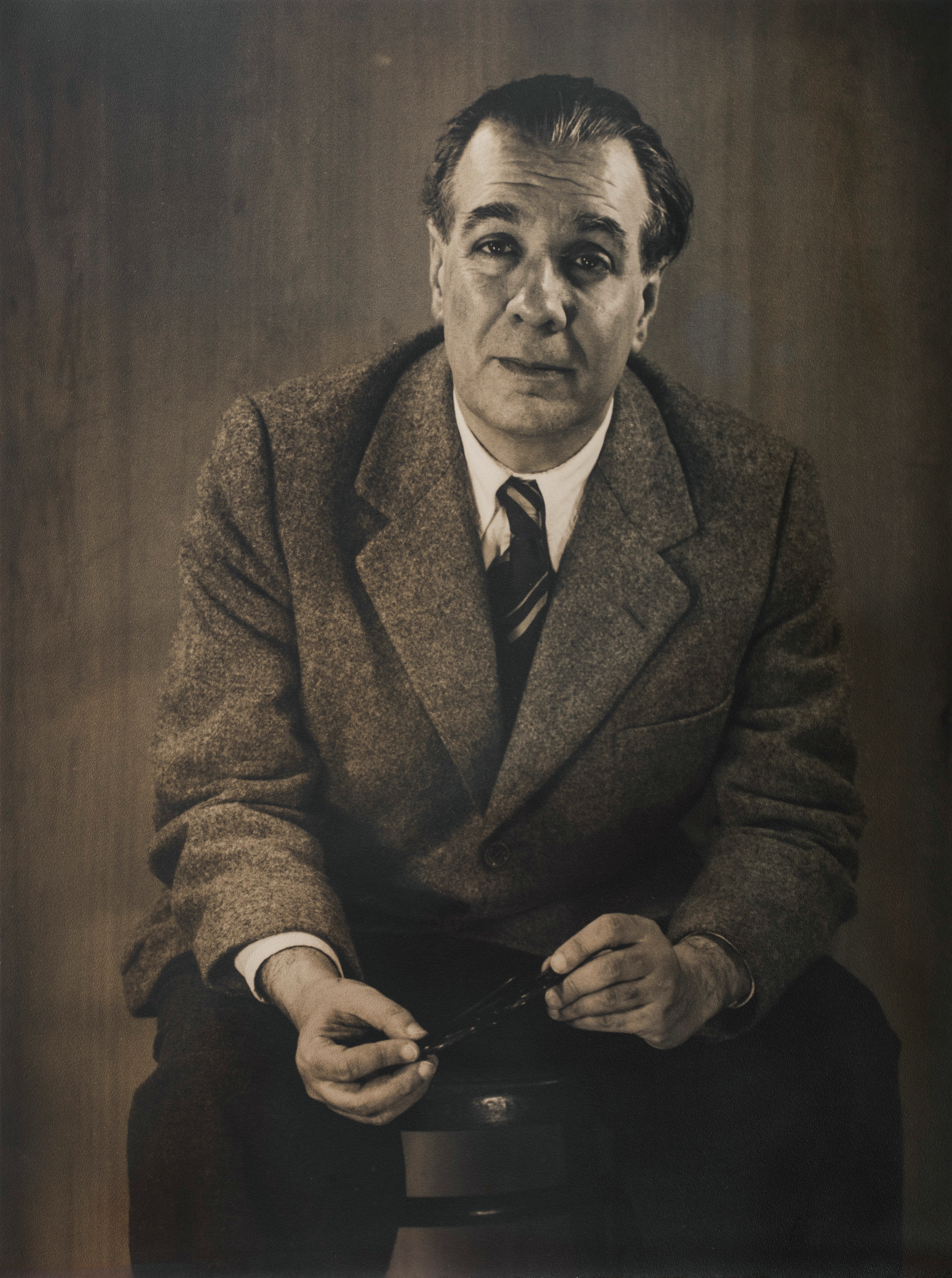
Jorge Luis Borges in 1951

The Argentinean author, Jorge Luis Borges wrote the short story Funes the Memorious in 1944. It depicts the life of Ireneo Funes, a fictional character who falls off his horse and experiences a head injury. After this accident, Funes has total recall abilities. He is said to recall an entire day with no mistakes, but this feat of recall takes him an entire day to accomplish. It is said that Borges was ahead of his time in his description of memory processes in this story, as it was not until the 1950s and research on the patient HM that some of what the author describes began to be understood.

A more recent instance of total recall in literature is found in is in Stieg Larsson's books The Girl with the Dragon Tattoo, in which the lead character, Lisbeth Salander remembers anything she reads, indicating she has total recall ability. Another example is in Dan Brown's books The Da Vinci Code and Angels & Demons, in which the main character, Dr. Robert Langdon, a religious iconography and symbology professor at Harvard University, has almost total recall ability. In The Curious Incident of the Dog in the Nighttime by Mark Haddon, the main character, Christopher Boone, is a 15-year-old autistic boy with total recall abilities.

Total recall is also popular in television. It can be seen in Season 4 of the television show "Criminal Minds", in which the character Dr. Spencer Reid claims to have total recall ability. Agent Fox Mulder from the television show "The X-Files" has a photographic memory, a popular term for total recall. Also, the character of hospital resident Lexie Grey on the television show "Grey's Anatomy" has total recall ability.

=== Amnesia ===
Amnesia which is the damage or disruption of memory processes, has been a very popular subject in movies since 1915. Although its portrayal is usually inaccurate, there are some exceptions. Memento (2000) is said to be inspired by the condition of the famous amnesic patient known as HM. The main character Leonard has anterograde amnesia after a traumatic attack in which his wife dies. He maintains his identity and shows very little retrograde amnesia. He also displays some of the daily memory problems that are experiences by most amnesics, such as forgetting names or where he is going. Another fairly accurate portrayal of memory disturbances is the non-human character Dory in Finding Nemo (2003). This fish, like Leonard, shows memory problems faced by most amnesics where she forgets names, has difficulty storing and recalling information, and often forgets what she is doing, or why she is doing something.

Movies tend to show amnesia as a result of head injury from accidents or attacks. The loss of identity and autobiographical memory shown in Santa Who? (2000) in which Santa has amnesia that destroys his identity and memory of himself is very unlikely in the real world. This is also portrayed in The Bourne Identity (2002) and The Bourne Supremacy (2004) where the main character forgets he is a trained assassin. Another misrepresentation of the reality of memory loss in the movies can be seen in Clean Slate (1994) and 50 First Dates (2004) where the characters are able to encode memory during the day but lose all memory of that day at night, while sleeping.

Movies often restore affected person's memory through a second trauma, or through a kind of cued recall when they revisit familiar places or see familiar objects. The phenomenon of the second trauma can be seen in Singing in the Dark (1956) where the affected individual experiences the onset of amnesia because of the trauma of the Holocaust, but memory is restored with a blow to the head. Although neurosurgery is often the cause of amnesia, it is seen as a solution in some movies, including Deluxe Annie (1918) and Rascals (1938).

Memory erasure is portrayed in Eternal Sunshine of the Spotless Mind (2004) and in the Men in Black movies. Men in Black features a device to erase the potentially harmful memories of extraterrestrial interactions in members of the general public. Eternal Sunshine of the Spotless Mind describes a process that targets and erases memories of interpersonal relationships the patients would rather forget so that they are no longer able to recall the experience. In Paycheck (2003) and Total Recall (1990) memory suppression is used to control and the characters are able to overcome the attempts and recall pieces of their memory.

== Consequences ==
=== Improving subsequent memory ===
By repeating (or recalling [?]) an item over and over again, memory can improve. This process is also known as rehearsal.

=== Impairing subsequent memory ===
Retrieval-induced forgetting is a process by which retrieving an item from long-term memory impairs subsequent recall of related items.

== See also ==
- Memory and retention in learning
- List of language disorders
