= Free recall =

Memory paradigm

Free recall is a common task in the psychological study of memory. In this task, participants study a list of items on each trial, and then are prompted to recall the items in any order. Items are usually presented one at a time for a short duration, and can be any of a number of nameable materials, although traditionally, words from a larger set are chosen. The recall period typically lasts a few minutes, and can involve spoken or written recall. The standard test involves the recall period starting immediately after the final list item; this can be referred to as immediate free recall (IFR) to distinguish it from delayed free recall (DFR). In delayed free recall, there is a short distraction period between the final list item and the start of the recall period. Both IFR and DFR have been used to test certain effects that appear during recall tests, such as the primacy effect and recency effect.

== Methodology used in measuring performance ==
One of the basic measures of performance in the free recall task is the number of words recalled from a list, which varies with a number of factors, including the list length, the type of material studied, and any task used to process the words (e.g., a simple judgement). When one examines the probability of recall by the position of the item in the list (its serial position), one finds that the initial and terminal items in the list are better remembered than those in the middle (also known as the primacy and recency items, respectively). Primacy effects generally come from the idea that greater attention is devoted to items that appear at the beginning of presentation lists. Bennet B. Murdock presents a classic study of serial-position effects in free recall. In his experiment, Murdock used six groups of 103 participants. Each group was given different combinations of list lengths and presentation rates. Three of the groups were shown lists of ten, fifteen, and twenty words with a presentation rate of two seconds per word. The other three groups were shown lists of twenty, thirty, and forty words with a one-second presentation rate for each word. There were 80 lists in total that included randomly selected common English words. After the presentation of each list, subjects were asked to recall as many words as possible in any order. Results from the experiment showed that all groups expressed both primacy effects and recency effects. Recency effects were exhibited regardless of the length of the list, and it was strongest for the words in the last eight serial positions. The primacy effect extended over the first four serial positions.

Another evidence of the recency effect is found in the way that participants initiate recall of a list: they most often start with terminal (recent) list items (an early description of the recency effect in the probability of first recall can be found in Hogan, 1975). Recency effects come from the notion that terminal list items tend to be better recalled than other items. This particular effect has generated much controversy and experimentation due to the speculation about why items that are rehearsed less should be so well remembered. A standard explanation for these effects is that they represent output from primary memory, or the short-term memory buffer system.

Recency effects show how well subjects can remember the last items relative to how well they remember the other items. Glenberg's theory can be used to determine the magnitude of the recency effect, depending on how effective the retrieval cues are for the last item relative to the other items. Several types of experiments can be done to test the recency effect for free recall. One experiment that is commonly used is the distractor-recall paradigm, as done by Rundus (1980). Another study that exhibits the recency effect during free recall is when subjects learn several different lists followed by recall tests, and then a final unexpected recall test at the end of the experiment where they are required to recall as many items as possible from all of the lists. Results show that participants tend to recall items from the more recent lists.

== Serial-recall paradigm ==
Studies have also been done to address the best method for recalling lists of unrelated words. In contrast to free recall, another type of study is known as the serial-recall paradigm, where participants are asked to recall the presented items in their correct order rather than the order that comes to mind at the time of testing, randomly. Experiments have shown that in comparison to free recall, the serial-recall learning curve increases linearly with the number of trials. The purpose of a study by Bruner, Miller, and Zimmerman (1955) was to determine if this learning difference is a result of the order in which the participant sees the items, or if it is instead dependent on the order in which the participant is told to recall the items. The study involved three different conditions: serial recall, free recall with items to be recalled randomized before each trial, and free recall with the order of the items kept constant. The experiment tested nine college students on 18 series of words. In addition to the linear serial-recall learning curve, it was found that more words are forgotten when recall is free than when it is serial. This study also supported the notion that the difference between the types of recall depends on the order in which the learner must recall the items, and not on the order in which the items are presented.

Beyond examining the relative probability of particular items being recalled, one can examine the order in which items are retrieved during the recall period. When a participant successfully recalls an item from a set of studied items, there is a marked tendency for the next item recalled to come from neighboring positions in the study set, with an advantage for items that followed the recalled item over items that preceded it. This effect, known as the contiguity effect, was first characterized by Michael J. Kahana, and has been shown to be robust across many free recall experiments.

== Subjective organization ==
Classic studies of free recall often focused on the multi-trial free recall paradigm, in which the same set of items appear on successive trials (although usually the order of the items is scrambled across trials). In this version of the paradigm, researchers would focus on how many trials it took to learn a certain proportion of the items. Tulving (1968) describes the phenomenon of subjective organization, in which words that are recalled successively during the first recall period also tend to be recalled successively during later recall periods. In addition to subjective organization, these multi-trial free recall paradigms are also used to analyze the effects of practice on recall tasks. Improvement in recall of items over multiple trials has been termed the learning-to-learn effect (LTL). To explore the results of practice on item recall, two experiments have been done to compare effects on free recall and ordered recall. The first experiment consisted of multiple presentations of words, and required the subjects to recall the lists by either ordered or free recall. The second experiment had multiple trials, where each trial consisted of the presentation of words followed by a recall test. Participants were given five trials for each of the lists. Results of the experiments showed that in order to produce the learning-to-learn effect in free recall, participants should be given multiple trials rather than multiple presentations.

== Understanding of neurological processes ==
Free recall studies have given yield to new understanding of neurological processes. In particular, the Dynamic Tagging Theory makes use of statistical data taken from such experiments in formulating a phenomenological explanation of short-term memory. George A. Miller wrote a widely known paper describing the limitations of memory and the power of categories to improve recall, especially in short-term memory. He popularized the short term memory limitation by calling it "The Magical Number Seven, Plus or Minus Two".

Some brain regions that are most commonly utilized in free recall include the hippocampus, fusiform gyrus, and inferior prefrontal cortex. In fact, greater activity in these brain regions while studying a list is linked to better subsequent recall.
