= Stephan Lewandowsky =

Australian psychologist (born 1958)

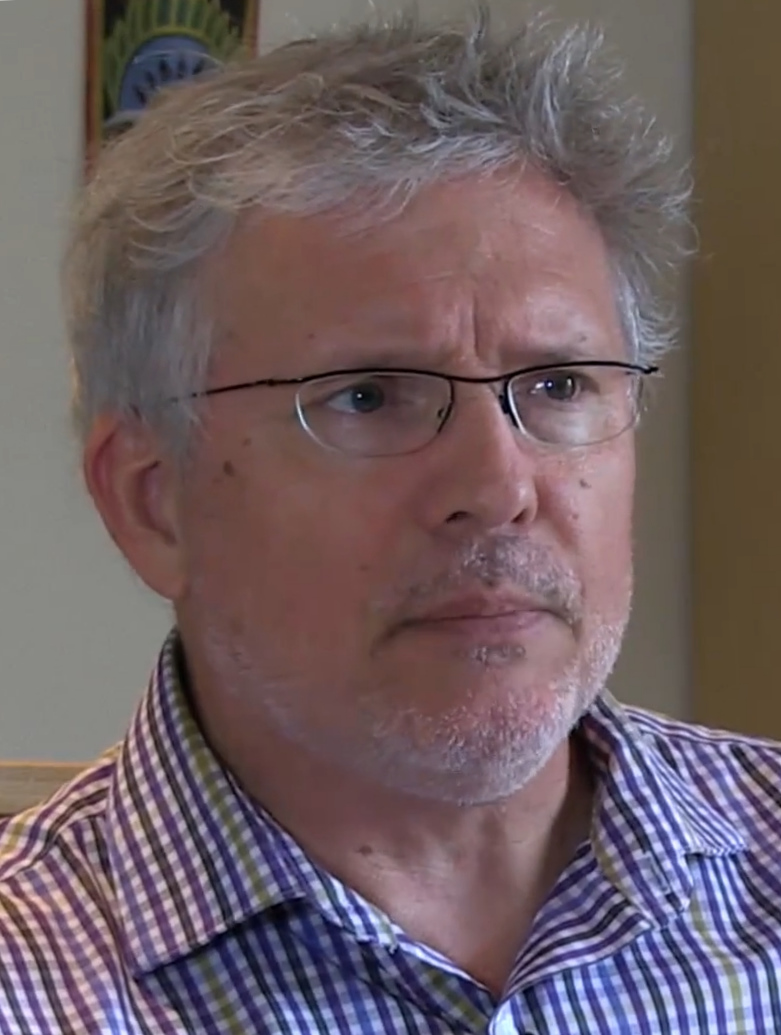
- Lewandowsky in 2016
- Born: 3 June 1958 (age 68); Berlin
- Citizenship: Australia; United Kingdom
- Education: Washington College, University of Toronto
- Known for: Research into the public's acceptance of science and belief in conspiracy theories
- Awards: Royal Society Wolfson Research Merit Award
- Scientific career
- Fields: Psychology
- Workplaces: University of Bristol, University of Western Australia
- Thesis: Priming in recognition memory for categorised lists (1985)
- Doctoral advisor: Bennet Murdock

Stephan Lewandowsky (born 3 June 1958) is an Australian psychologist. He has worked in both the United States and Australia, and is currently based at the University of Bristol, UK, where he is the chair of cognitive psychology at the School of Psychological Science. His research, which originally pertained to computer simulations of people's decision-making processes, recently has focused on the public's understanding of science and why people often embrace beliefs that are sharply at odds with scientific evidence.

== Education and career ==
Lewandowsky received his bachelor's degree from Washington College in 1980, followed by an M.A. in 1981 and a PhD in 1985, both from the University of Toronto. He served as an assistant professor of psychology at the University of Oklahoma from 1990 to 1994, and as associate professor for one year after that. In 1995, he joined the University of Western Australia, where he became the Winthrop Professor of Psychology in 2000. He remained there until April 2013, when he joined the University of Bristol. In 2014, he was named the first Digital Content Editor at the Psychonomic Society.

In 2015, Lewandowsky was elected a fellow of the Committee for Skeptical Inquiry.

== Research ==
=== Correction of misinformation ===
Lewandowsky has published a number of studies examining people's belief in misinformation. In 2005, he was the lead author of a study which investigated people's beliefs in assertions about the Iraq War that had been retracted officially, and which examined people's beliefs about these assertions in Australia, the United States, and Germany. He and his co-authors found that American participants in the study persisted in believing the assertions even after being informed that they had been retracted. Lewandowsky told the Wall Street Journal that the original misinformation already had become a part of the Americans' mental worldview by the time it was retracted. He also noted that "People who were not suspicious of the motives behind the war continued to rely on misinformation." In 2012, Lewandowsky published an article in Psychological Science in the Public Interest which examined the literature on misinformation and efforts to correct it. He found a considerable amount of speculation but little concrete research into the area.

With John Cook, Lewandowsky wrote "The Debunking Handbook", a review of research on debunking falsehoods and a guide to better practices for doing so. Much of "The Debunking Handbook" focuses on "backfire effects", whereby telling people that they are wrong often reinforces their prior beliefs, rather than weakening them. An updated Debunking Handbook 2020 tries to represent the consensus of the field.

=== Climate change and conspiracy theories ===
In 2012, Lewandowsky put forward what would later become one of his best-known studies regarding public opinion on climate change. The survey examined data from more than 1,000 readers of climate science blogs, taken from online questionnaires posted there. Lewandowsky approached five climate sceptic blogs to ask them to post the questionnaire, but they all declined to do so. The study was accepted by Psychological Science on 7 July 2012, and published in the May 2013 issue of the journal with the title, "NASA Faked the Moon Landing—Therefore, (Climate) Science Is a Hoax". Based on a survey of visitors to global warming related blogs, Lewandowsky and his two co-authors concluded that belief in free-market economics was associated with being more likely to reject not only the mainstream scientific view of global warming, but also the mainstream scientific position on whether HIV causes AIDS and whether tobacco smoking causes lung cancer. The study also concluded that believing in a "cluster of conspiracy theories"—such as that the FBI was responsible for the assassination of Martin Luther King, Jr.—was also associated with being more likely to reject the consensus view on global warming.

Gary Marcus wrote that the paper's findings "fit in with a longer literature on what has come to be known as 'motivated reasoning.'" The reaction to the paper from global warming sceptics was overwhelmingly negative, with Joanne Nova referring to it as "an ad hom argument taken to its absurd extreme, rebadged as 'science'."

Later in 2013, Lewandowsky published another paper on a similar topic in Nature Climate Change. In that study, he and his co-authors told the study participants that 97% of climate scientists believe humans are causing global warming, and found that this significantly increased the proportion of people who believed it as well. They also reported that the effect was most discernible for those with free-market views. These findings contributed to what is now known as the Gateway Belief Model. Also in 2013, Lewandowsky and co-authors conducted another survey in which he examined the relationship between believing in conspiracy theories (such as 9/11 conspiracy theories) and rejection of various forms of science. They found that believing in such conspiracy theories was strongly associated with being more likely to reject all forms of science, such as climate change science, the safety of genetically modified foods, and the safety of vaccines.

==== "Recursive fury" ====
On 28 March 2013, Lewandowsky published "Recursive fury: Conspiracist ideation in the blogosphere in response to research on conspiracist ideation" in the journal Frontiers in Psychology. This paper described the reaction of climate change deniers to pre-publication versions of the "NASA Faked the Moon Landing—Therefore, (Climate) Science Is a Hoax" study that he had submitted to Psychological Science in 2012. His analysis found that, of the hypotheses generated by climate change deniers in response to his 2012 study, "many...exhibited conspiratorial content and counterfactual thinking."

The Frontiers in Psychology journal received immediate complaints, and took the paper down while it carried out an investigation. The paper was retracted with a notice published in March 2014, which stated:

In the light of a small number of complaints received following publication of the original research article cited above, Frontiers carried out a detailed investigation of the academic, ethical, and legal aspects of the work. This investigation did not identify any issues with the academic and ethical aspects of the study. It did, however, determine that the legal context is insufficiently clear and therefore Frontiers wishes to retract the published article. The authors understand this decision, while they stand by their article and regret the limitations on academic freedom which can be caused by legal factors.

Ars Technica reported that its questions were referred by the publishers to their lawyer, who told Ars: "Frontiers is concerned about solid science, and it's obviously a regret when you have to retract an article that is scientifically and ethically sound." Freedom of Information requests made by DeSmogBlog had obtained copies of the complaints, which included allegations of misconduct: some used legal terms such as "defamatory".

Staff of the Australian Psychological Society wrote to Lewandowsky expressing concern "that some scientific journals feel sufficiently threatened by potential liability fears to not publish articles with 'inconvenient information' about climate change." Elaine McKewon—who was one of the peer-reviewers of the Lewandowsky paper, in addition to being a research associate at the Australian Centre for Independent Journalism, University of Technology, Sydney—said that she was "profoundly disappointed" by its retraction, and that, "Shortly after publication, Frontiers received complaints from climate deniers who claimed they had been libeled in the paper and threatened to sue the journal unless the paper was retracted." McKewon was quoted as saying that the journal had "caved in at the first pushback from the climate change denial community". The Sydney Morning Herald reported that academics had described the retraction as having "a chilling effect on research". The University of Western Australia published the paper online after doing its own risk analysis; their lawyer, Kim Heitman, said that there was no reason to take it down.

After media reports about this retraction, the journal's Editorial Director Costanza Zucca and Executive Editor Fred Fenter made a joint statement on the journal's blog that "Frontiers did not 'cave in to threats'; in fact, Frontiers received no threats." The statement said that the main reason for retraction was insufficient protection for the rights of the studied subjects. Ars Technica reported that this statement appeared to differ from the retraction notice, and according to one of the authors of the paper an anonymised version had been produced to meet the privacy concerns. Lewandowsky said that there had been a legally binding agreement on the original notice, and what he took "exception to is their latest statement, which is incompatible with the signed agreement and complete news to us". The paper was available at the web page of the University of Western Australia, however it no longer is.

The paper was later republished in the Journal of Social and Political Psychology along with additional data, under the title "Recurrent fury: Conspiratorial Discourse in the Blogosphere Triggered by Research on the Role of Conspiracist Ideation in Climate Denial".

=== Perception of uncertainty ===
In May 2014, Lewandowsky published a two-part study on the relationship between uncertainty and the dangers of climate change, in which he argued that policymakers who argue that the scientific understanding of climate change is too uncertain to act are mistaken. Instead, the study argues that "on the contrary, uncertainty implies that the problem is more likely to be worse than expected in the absence of that uncertainty." Lewandowsky told Salon that these studies showed that "uncertainty also increases the likelihood of exceeding 'safe' temperature limits and the probability of failing to reach mitigation targets."

=== Global warming hiatus ===
A 2015 study by Lewandowsky, James Risbey, and Naomi Oreskes found that there is no substantive evidence of a global warming hiatus.

=== Psychological features cluster identified ===
In its March 2019 edition, Scientific American published an article about his work that posited that people drawn to conspiracy theories share some psychological characteristics that may be clustered. A secondary title to the article asserted: "Baseless theories threaten our safety and democracy. It turns out that specific emotions make people prone to such thinking".

== Selected works ==
- The Debunking Handbook (Version 2), (2012) St. Lucia, Australia. ISBN 978-0-646-56812-6. OCLC 768864362
- The Debunking Handbook 2020 (2020) doi:10.17910/b7.1182
