= Serial-position effect =

Psychological concept

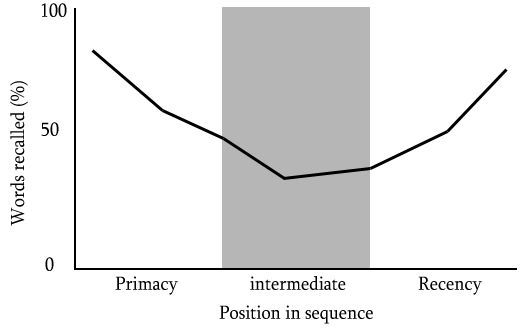

Serial-position effect is the tendency of a person to recall the first and last items in a series best, and the middle items worst. The term was coined by Hermann Ebbinghaus through studies he performed on himself, and refers to the finding that recall accuracy varies as a function of an item's position within a study list. When asked to recall a list of items in any order (free recall), people tend to begin recall with the end of the list, recalling those items best (the recency effect). Among earlier list items, the first few items are recalled more frequently than the middle items (the primacy effect).

One suggested reason for the primacy effect is that the initial items presented are most effectively stored in long-term memory because of the greater amount of processing devoted to them. (The first list item can be rehearsed by itself; the second must be rehearsed along with the first, the third along with the first and second, and so on.) The primacy effect is reduced when items are presented quickly and is enhanced when presented slowly (factors that reduce and enhance processing of each item and thus permanent storage). Longer presentation lists have been found to reduce the primacy effect.

One theorised reason for the recency effect is that these items are still present in working memory when recall is solicited. Items that benefit from neither (the middle items) are recalled most poorly. An additional explanation for the recency effect is related to temporal context: if tested immediately after rehearsal, the current temporal context can serve as a retrieval cue, which would predict more recent items to have a higher likelihood of recall than items that were studied in a different temporal context (earlier in the list). The recency effect is reduced when an interfering task is given. Intervening tasks involve working memory, as the distractor activity, if exceeding 15 to 30 seconds in duration, can cancel out the recency effect. Additionally, if recall comes immediately after the test, the recency effect is consistent regardless of the length of the studied list, or presentation rate.

Amnesiacs with poor ability to form permanent long-term memories do not show a primacy effect, but do show a recency effect if recall comes immediately after study. People with Alzheimer's disease exhibit a reduced primacy effect but do not produce a recency effect in recall.

== Primacy effect ==
In psychology and sociology, the primacy effect (also known as the primacy bias) is a cognitive bias that results in a subject recalling primary information presented better than information presented later on. For example, a subject who reads a sufficiently long list of words is more likely to remember words toward the beginning than words in the middle.

Many researchers have tried to explain this phenomenon through free recall [null tests]. Coluccia, Gamboz, and Brandimonte (2011) explain free recall as participants trying to remember information without any prompting. In some experiments in the late 20th century, it was noted that participants who knew that they were going to be tested on a list presented to them would rehearse items: as items were presented, the participants would repeat those items to themselves and as new items were presented, the participants would continue to rehearse previous items along with the newer items. It was demonstrated that the primacy effect had a greater influence on recall when there was more time between presentation of items so that participants would have a greater chance to rehearse previous (prime) items.

Overt rehearsal was a technique that was meant to test participants' rehearsal patterns. In an experiment using this technique, participants were asked to recite out loud the items that come to mind. In this way, the experimenter was able to see that participants would repeat earlier items more than items in the middle of the list, thus rehearsing them more frequently and having a better recall of the prime items than the middle items later on.

In another experiment, by Brodie and Murdock, the recency effect was found to be partially responsible for the primacy effect. In their experiment, they also used the overt-rehearsal technique and found that in addition to rehearsing earlier items more than later items, participants were rehearsing earlier items later on in the list. In this way, earlier items were closer to the test period by way of rehearsal and could be partially explained by the recency effect.

In 2013, a study showed that primacy effect is also prominent in decision making based on experience in a repeated-choice paradigm, a learning process also known as operant conditioning. The authors showed that importance attached to the value of the first reward on subsequent behaviour, a phenomenon they denoted as outcome primacy.

In another study, participants received one of two sentences. For example, one may be given "Steve is smart, diligent, critical, impulsive, and jealous." and the other "Steve is jealous, impulsive, critical, diligent, and smart." These two sentences contain the same information. The first one suggests positive trait at the beginning while the second one has negative traits. Researchers found that the subjects evaluated Steve more positively when given the first sentence, compared with the second one.

== Recency effect ==
Two traditional classes of theories explain the recency effect.

=== Dual-store models ===
These models postulate that study items listed last are retrieved from a highly accessible short-term buffer, i.e. the short-term store (STS) in human memory. This allows items that are recently studied to have an advantage over those that were studied earlier, as earlier study items have to be retrieved with greater effort from one's long-term memory store (LTS).

An important prediction of such models is that the presentation of a distraction, for example solving arithmetic problems for 10–30 seconds, during the retention period (the time between list presentation and test) attenuates the recency effect. Since the STS has limited capacity, the distraction displaces later study list items from the STS so that at test, these items can only be retrieved from the LTS, and have lost their earlier advantage of being more easily retrieved from the short-term buffer. As such, dual-store models successfully account for both the recency effect in immediate recall tasks, and the attenuation of such an effect in the delayed free recall task.

A major problem with this model, however, is that it cannot predict the long-term recency effect observed in delayed recall, when a distraction intervenes between each study item during the interstimulus interval (continuous distractor task). Since the distraction is still present after the last study item, it should displace the study item from STS such that the recency effect is attenuated. The existence of this long-term recency effect thus raises the possibility that immediate and long-term recency effects share a common mechanism.

=== Single-store models ===
According to single-store theories, a single mechanism is responsible for serial-position effects. A first type of model is based on relative temporal distinctiveness, in which the time lag between the study of each list item and the test determines the relative competitiveness of an item's memory trace at retrieval. In this model, end-of-list items are thought to be more distinct, and hence more easily retrieved.

Another type of model is based on contextual variability, which postulates that retrieval of items from memory is cued not only based on one's mental representation of the study item itself, but also of the study context. Since context varies and increasingly changes with time, on an immediate free-recall test, when memory items compete for retrieval, more recently studied items will have more similar encoding contexts to the test context, and are more likely to be recalled.

Outside immediate free recall, these models can also predict the presence or absence of the recency effect in delayed free recall and continual-distractor free-recall conditions. Under delayed recall conditions, the test context would have drifted away with increasing retention interval, leading to attenuated recency effect. Under continual distractor recall conditions, while increased interpresentation intervals reduce the similarities between study context and test context, the relative similarities among items remains unchanged. As long as the recall process is competitive, recent items will win out, so a recency effect is observed.

=== Ratio rule ===
Overall, an important empirical observation regarding the recency effect is that it is not the absolute duration of retention intervals (RI, the time between end of study and test period) or of inter-presentation intervals (IPI, the time between different study items) that matters. Rather, the amount of recency is determined by the ratio of RI to IPI (the ratio rule). As a result, as long as this ratio is fixed, recency will be observed regardless of the absolute values of intervals, so that recency can be observed at all time scales, a phenomenon known as time-scale invariance. This contradicts dual-store models, which assume that recency depends on the size of STS, and the rule governing the displacement of items in the STS.

Potential explanations either then explain the recency effect as occurring through a single, same mechanism, or re-explain it through a different type of model that postulates two different mechanisms for immediate and long-term recency effects. One such explanation is provided by Davelaar et al. (2005), who argue that there are dissociations between immediate and long-term recency phenomena that cannot be explained by a single-component memory model, and who argues for the existence of a STS that explains immediate recency, and a second mechanism based on contextual drift that explains long-term recency. The recency effect as well as the ratio changes in Alzheimer's disease and therefore can be used as an indicator of this disease condition from the earliest stages of neurodegeneration

== Related effects ==
In 1977, William Crano decided to outline a study to further the previous conclusions on the nature of order effects, in particular those of primacy vs. recency, which were said to be unambiguous and opposed in their predictions. The specifics tested by Crano were:

Change of meaning hypothesis
The items on the beginning of a list establish a theme that the participants expect the rest of the list to fall into. The participant modified the meaning of some of the words on the list to fit with the expectation he or she established. Watkins and Peynicioglu (1984) explain this as participants changing the meaning of words, deviating from the established theme, to reduce the amount of deviation in the information presented.
Inconsistency discounting
Participants would disregard information that was not consistent with previous items presented to them. In other words, discounting involves thinking of inconsistent information as having less value than information that is consistent with other information presented (Devine & Ostrom, 1985).
Attention decrement hypothesis
Information presented first has a greater influence on participants than information that is presented later, causing a primacy effect to occur, even if the information is consistent. Steiner and Rain (1989) explain people pay more attention to information presented at the beginning, but progressively pay less attention to the information presented to them. The primacy effect occurs because participants pay attention to the beginning information and ignore the information presented later. On the other hand, if participants are in a situation where they have to continuously pay attention to information, a recency effect may occur.

The continuity effect or lag-recency effect predicts that having made a successful recall, the next recalled item is less likely to come from a remote serial position, rather than a nearby serial position (Kahana, Howard, Zaromb & Wingfiend, 2002). The difference between the two items' serial position is referred to as serial-position lag. Another factor, called the conditional-response probability, is the likelihood of recalling a certain serial-position lag. A graph of serial-position lag versus conditional response probability reveals that the next item recalled minimizes absolute lag, with a higher likelihood for the adjacent than the previous one.

== See also ==
- Anchoring (cognitive bias)
- Clive Wearing
- Henry Molaison
- Law of primacy in persuasion
- Learning curve
- List of cognitive biases
- List of memory biases
- Peak–end rule
- Principles of learning
- Reminiscence bump
