= Sex differences in memory =

Concept in cognitive psychology

Memory, in general, is fairly stable across the sexes. By studying the specific instances in which males and females demonstrate differences in memory, we are able to further understand the brain structures and functions associated with memory.

It is within specific experimental trials that differences appear, such as methods of recalling past events, explicit facial emotion recognition tasks, and neuroimaging studies regarding size and activation of different brain regions. Research seems to focus especially on gender differences in explicit memory. Like many other nuances of the human psyche, these differences are studied with the goal of lending insight to a greater understanding of the human brain.

== History of research ==
Perceptions of gender differences in cognitive abilities date back to ancient Greece, when the early physician Hippocrates dubbed the term 'hysteria' or 'wandering womb' to account for emotional instability and mental illness in women. This diagnosis survived up until the mid-19th century and the beginning of the women's suffrage movement, and was used as evidence for women's inability to handle intellectual work. Prominent physicians of this era, including neurologist Sigmund Freud, argued that women were biologically suited to homemaking and housework, as they did not have enough blood to power both the brain and the uterus. When women began attending university in the late 19th and early 20th centuries, opponents asserted that the high demands of post-secondary education on the female brain would render women sterile.

The mass entrance of women into the workplace during World War I to replace the conscripted men fighting overseas, provided a turning point for views on women's cognitive abilities. Having demonstrated that they were capable of functioning in the workplace, women gained the right to vote in post-war United States, Canada, and the United Kingdom. Though women were able to vote and hold paid employment, they were still not regarded as intellectually equal to men. The development of the encephalization quotient by Harry Jerison in 1973 seemed to confirm popular beliefs and about women's cognitive abilities; this quotient was one of the first means of indirectly measuring brain size, and it demonstrated that women have, on average, smaller brain areas than men.

== Specific areas of memory ==
The results from research on sex differences in memory are mixed and inconsistent, as some studies show no difference, and others show a female or male advantage.

Sex differences in specific domains of memory
Memory domain	Better-performing sex	Ref.
Episodic memory (overall)	Female	
Memory for faces	Female	
Memory for names	Female	
Olfactory memory	Female	
Rate of age-related memory decline	No difference	
Semantic memory based on general knowledge in different areas	Male	
Short-term memory	No difference	
Memory for sounds (melodies)	Female	
Spatial memory (overall)	Male	
Spatial memory for location of objects (overall)	Female	
Spatial memory for location of distant objects	Male	
Verbal memory	Female	
Memory of visual stimuli (overall)	No difference	

=== Short-term memory ===
Women have consistently demonstrated a stronger short-term memory than men on tests. This is supported by data that gauges learning ability in terms of word lists and the development of strategies that improve the ability to learn new things and impede interference; however, there is also data that indicates that men are better at short-term memory tasks than women when visual stimuli is a factor, but this research lacks consistency.

=== Autobiographical memory ===
Women on average report more memories in the observer perspective than men. A theory for this phenomenon is that women are more conscious about their personal appearance than men. According to objectification theory, social and cultural expectations have created a society where women are far more objectified than men.

In situations where one's physical appearance and actions are important (for example, giving a speech in front of an audience), the memory of that situation will likely be remembered in the observer perspective. This is due to the general trend that when the focus of attention in a person's memory is on themselves, they will likely see themselves from someone else's point of view. This is because, in "center-of-attention" memories, the person is conscious about the way they are presenting themselves and instinctively try to envision how others were perceiving them.

According to the theory—since women feel more objectified than men, they tend to be put in center-of-attention situations more often, which results in recalling more memories from the observer perspective. Studies also show that events with greater social interaction and significance produce more observer memories in women than events with low or no social interaction or significance. Observer perspective in men was generally unaffected by the type of event. Counterarguments to the theory are that people with social anxiety don't have a particularly strong autobiographical memory, which is what you would expect according to this theory. Females also show differences in male memory that isn't accounted for by some sociological reason.

== Memory loss ==
Research suggests that there may be gendered differences in rates of memory decline. While research on the subject has not always been consistent, it's clear that men and women experience significantly different rates of memory decline throughout their life.

It was once decided that the difference in memory decline between genders was due to the typically longer lifespan of a woman, however, this has since been disproven. The difference between the lifespan of a male and female is not great enough to explain the additional onset of memory decline from disease that woman experience.

== Alzheimer's disease ==
As men and women age, dementia become more likely to manifest. Dementia has been reported to affect up to 5% of people over the age of 65. Of the different types of dementia, Alzheimer's disease is the most common, accounting for up to 65% of dementia cases. Research into the disease is ongoing, but there appears to be evidence supporting the claim that Alzheimer's manifests differently between the sexes. There is also evidence that Alzheimer's disease is more common in women than in men.

Multiple studies have found that there is a significant difference in the symptoms of Alzheimer's disease that affect the sexes. Some of these behavioral and psychological symptoms of dementia (BPSD) include depression, anxiety, dysphoria, nighttime disturbances, and aggression. Several recent studies have found that women tend to exhibit symptoms such as depression and anxiety more often than men. One study has even gone as far as to suggest that having depression at any point during midlife increases chances of Alzheimer's Disease developing later by up to 70%. Men, on the other hand, exhibit symptoms such as aggression and other socially inappropriate behaviors more often. In addition, it has been found that men are more likely to have coronary artery disease which has been known to damage the blood brain barrier (BBB) by causing micro vascular lesions. Damage to the blood brain barrier seems to be connected to cognitive decline and several forms of dementia, including Alzheimer's Disease. Women with Alzheimer's disease also have more serious cognitive impairments in many indicators compared to men. Also, a number of studies of people with Alzheimer's disease have found a greater brain or cognitive reserve in men.

Another contributing factor to differences in Alzheimer's progression between the sexes may be socioeconomic status (SES). Men, historically, have had better opportunities to obtain an education and increase their SES. In recent years, women are being afforded many of the same opportunities, which may explain why there appears to be a decrease of instances of dementia in women related to SES factors.
