= Tip of the tongue =

Lexical phenomenon

Tip of the tongue (also known as TOT, or lethologica) is the phenomenon of failing to retrieve a word or term from memory, combined with partial recall and the feeling that retrieval is imminent. The phenomenon's name comes from the saying, "It's on the tip of my tongue." The tip of the tongue phenomenon reveals that lexical access occurs in stages.

People experiencing the tip-of-the-tongue phenomenon can often recall one or more features of the target word, such as the first letter, its syllabic stress, and words similar in sound, meaning, or both sound and meaning. Individuals report a feeling of being seized by the state, feeling something like mild anguish while searching for the word, and a sense of relief when the word is found. While many aspects of the tip-of-the-tongue state remain unclear, there are two major competing explanations for its occurrence: the direct-access view and the inferential view. Emotion and the strength of the emotional ties to what is trying to be remembered can also have an impact on the TOT phenomenon. The stronger the emotional ties, the longer it takes to retrieve the item from memory.

TOT states should be distinguished from FOK (feeling of knowing) states. FOK, in contrast, is the feeling that one will be able to recognize—from a list of items—an item that is currently inaccessible. There are still currently opposing hypotheses in the psychological literature regarding the separability of the process underlying these concepts. However, there is some evidence that TOTs and FOKs draw on different parts of the brain. TOTs are associated with the anterior cingulate, right dorsolateral prefrontal cortex, and right inferior cortex while FOKs are not. FOKs can be assessed through memory-monitoring testing in which a test subject is asked to "estimate the likelihood" of recognizing when "prompted with a cue" or information that they previously failed to remember. This test aims to measure a test subject's accuracy of memory monitoring during the "memory extraction stage".

An occasional tip-of-the-tongue state is normal for people of all ages; however, it becomes more frequent as people age. TOT can be referred as an actual medical condition, but only when it becomes frequent enough to interfere with learning or daily life. This disorder is called anomic aphasia when acquired by brain damage, usually from a head injury, stroke, or dementia.

The tip of the tongue phenomenon has implications for research in psycholinguistics, memory, and metacognition.

== History ==
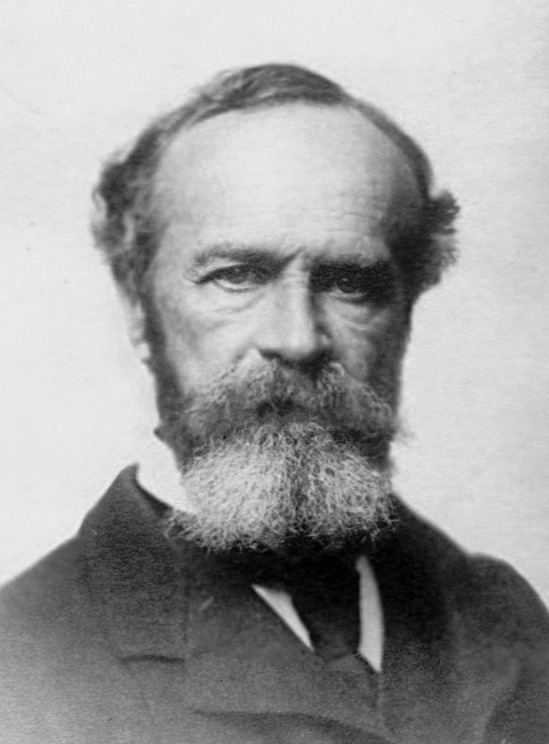
William James was the first psychologist to describe the tip of the tongue phenomenon, although he did not label it as such.

The term "tip of the tongue" is borrowed from colloquial usage, and possibly a calque from the French phrase avoir le mot sur le bout de la langue ("having the word on the tip of the tongue"). The tip of the tongue phenomenon was first described as a psychological phenomenon in the text The Principles of Psychology by William James (1890), although he did not label it as such.

Sigmund Freud also discussed unconscious psychological factors, such as unconscious thoughts and impulses that might cause forgetting familiar words.

The first empirical research on this phenomenon was undertaken by Harvard researchers Roger Brown and David McNeill and published in 1966 in the Journal of Verbal Learning and Verbal Behavior. Brown and McNeill wanted to determine whether the feeling of imminent retrieval experienced in the tip of the tongue state was based on actual retrieval ability or was just an illusion.

In their study, Brown and McNeill read out definitions (and only the definitions) of rare words to the study participants, and asked them to name the object or concept being defined. When the target word was later read by the experimenter participants were instructed to report whether they experienced a tip of the tongue state. Three types of positive TOT states were identified by Brown and McNeill:

1. The participant recognized the word read by the experimenter as the word he had been seeking.
2. The participant correctly recalled the word before it was read by the experimenter.
3. The subject recalled the word they were seeking before the target word was read by the experimenter, but the recalled word was not the intended target.

If a participant indicated a tip of the tongue state, they were asked to provide any information about the target word they could recall. Brown and McNeill found that participants could identify the first letter of the target word, the number of syllables of the target word, words of similar sound, words of similar meaning, syllabic pattern, and the serial position of some letters in the target word better than would be expected by chance. Their findings demonstrated the legitimacy of the feeling of knowing experienced in a tip of the tongue state. This study was the foundation for subsequent research about tip of the tongue phenomenon.

== Universality ==
Tip of the tongue experiences occur in both men and women, and is known to occur in young adulthood, middle age, and older adulthood. TOT experiences in childhood have not been studied. Education level is not thought to be a factor in the experience of TOT states. Monolinguals, bilinguals, and multilinguals all experience tip of the tongue states, although with varying frequencies (see § Effects of bilingualism below).

Many languages other than English have equivalent colloquial terms for the tip of the tongue experience, suggesting that it is a common experience across cultures. In a study by B. L. Schwartz (1999), 45 of the 51 languages surveyed have an idiom referring to the tip of the tongue phenomenon that references the tongue, mouth, or throat as a metaphor. The direct English translations of these idioms are "on the tongue", "on the tip/point/head of the tongue", "on the top of the tongue", "on the front of the tongue", "sparkling at the end of the tongue", and "in the mouth and throat". Notably, the languages studied that did not have an equivalent idiom for the tip of the tongue were American Sign Language, Amharic, Icelandic, Kalenjin, and Kiswahili. However, tip of the finger experiences are reported by signers.

== Causes ==
The causes of TOTs are largely unknown but numerous explanations have been offered. These explanations mainly fall within the realms of two overarching viewpoints: the direct-access view and the inferential view.

=== Direct-access view ===
The direct-access view posits that the state occurs when memory strength is not enough to recall an item, but is strong enough to trigger the state. That is, the rememberer has direct access to the target word's presence in memory, even though it cannot be immediately recalled. Theories of the causes of tip of the tongue phenomenon that adopt direct-access views include the blocking hypothesis, the incomplete-activation hypothesis, and the transmission-deficit model.

==== Blocking hypothesis ====
The blocking hypothesis states that retrieval cues elicit the retrieval of a word related to the target that then blocks the retrieval of the correct word and causes the tip of the tongue phenomenon to occur. In other words, TOTs occur when plausible but incorrect responses to a query come to mind quickly. The person recognizes that the related words are incorrect but cannot retrieve the correct word because it is inhibited. These related words are termed blockers because they block the ability to retrieve the correct word. This accounts for why TOTs predict memory performance. Once the inhibition of the correct word is removed or the blockers are forgotten, the TOT will be resolved. Evidence for this hypothesis is minimal as it is difficult to measure. Most research that takes on this approach give participants blockers and see if they produce TOT states. This method is controversial as it is unclear if the blockers given produce TOT states or act as retrieval cues.

The hypothesis that blockers act more like retrieval cues is mainly supported by the idea of phonological similarities between the target word and the blocker word. Phonological blockers are words that sound similar to the target word. According to Bown & Harley, "phonological neighbors (of blockers) usually act as support in lexical retrieval rather than as a hindrance". In contrast, an alternative argument suggests that phonological blockers hinder the ability to retrieve the target word causing a tip of the tongue state.
There is more support for the idea that blockers act as neither primers nor enhancers, but rather more like a side effect. In Metcalf & Kornell's research the incubation period helped participants to retrieve the word by the same amount for the original non-blocked TOTs and the blocked TOTs. This suggests that blockers have no effect on the retrieval or the causes of tip of the tongue states.

==== Incomplete-activation hypothesis ====
The incomplete activation hypothesis states that TOTs occur when the target word in memory is not sufficiently activated to be recalled but rememberers can sense its presence nonetheless. The accessibility of the target word fluctuates due to factors that increase its activation level, such as cues. The target word's activation level may fluctuate to a level that is high enough for it to be retrieved and the TOT state to be resolved.

==== Transmission-deficit model ====
The transmission deficit model is based on a multi-component theory of memory representation that suggests that semantic and phonological information is stored in memory and retrieved separately. The transmission deficit model posits that TOTs occur when there is activation of the semantic component of the target word memory but this activation does not pass on to the phonological level of the memory of the target word. Thus, TOTs are caused by the deficit in transmission of activation from the semantic memory store to the phonological memory store.

According to cognitive psychologists Deborah M. Burke, of Pomona College, and Donald G. MacKay, of the University of California, Los Angeles, this phenomenon occurs due primarily to three reasons, all based on weakened neural connection: the lack of frequent use of a word, the lack of recent use of a word, and aging.

=== Inferential view ===
The inferential view of TOTs claims that TOTs aren't completely inaccessible, but arise from clues about the target that the rememberer can piece together. This is to say that the rememberer infers their knowledge of the target word, and the imminence of retrieval depends upon the information that they are able to access about the target word from their memory. These views disregard the presence of the target word in memory as having an effect on creating tip of the tongue states.

==== Cue-familiarity theory ====
Cue-familiarity theory suggests that the strong feelings elicited by recognizing a familiar cue about the target word cause the tip of the tongue phenomenon. A familiar cue should create a TOT state, whether or not the target word is known. When one encounters a cue for a target word, the level of recognition is assessed, and a strong level of recognition will elicit a tip of the tongue state. It has been found that cues that are repetitive tend to create more TOTs than if one single cue is given. This might suggest that cue factors can play a role in causing TOT states.

==== Accessibility heuristic ====
The accessibility heuristic states that TOTs are elicited by the quantity and strength of the information that is retrieved from memory when the target word itself is not. When searching for a target word, the more information that is retrieved from memory, and the more the information retrieved is perceived to be related to the target word, the more likely a TOT state will be elicited.

== Phenomenon in the brain ==
=== Neuroimaging techniques used in the study of TOT ===
The body of research on the neurological mechanisms of the tip of the tongue phenomenon is limited. The research in this area has used magnetoencephalography(MEG) and event-related functional magnetic resonance imaging (fMRI).

=== Neurological activation in the TOT state ===
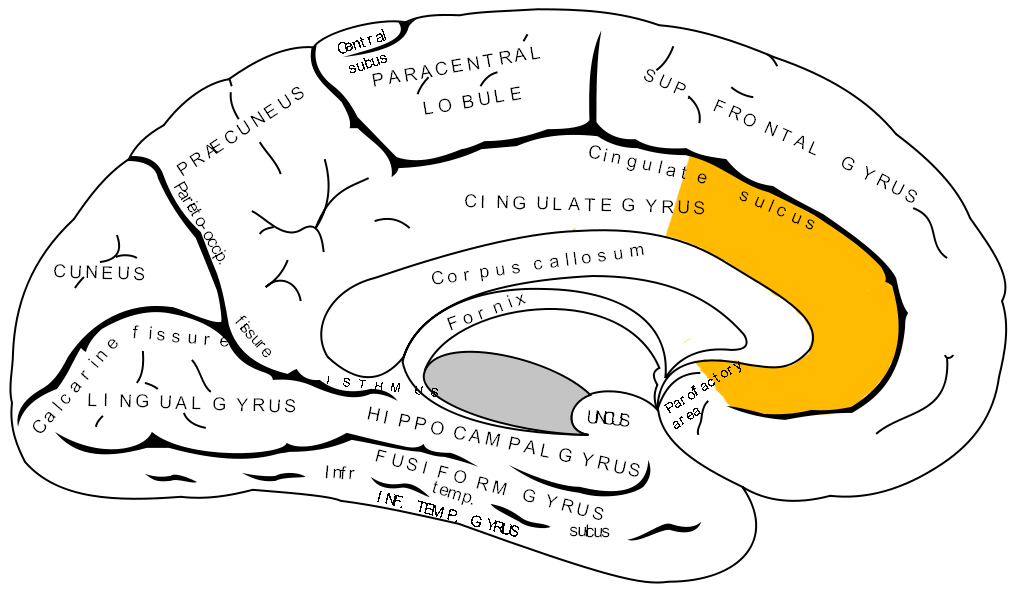
The anterior cingulate cortex shows increased activation in TOT states

Several areas of the brain show increased activation in a TOT state. The following is a list of the specific structures that show increased activation during a tip of the tongue state:

- Anterior cingulate cortex (ACC)
- Posterior cingulate cortex (PCC)
- Right dorsolateral prefrontal cortex (DLPFC)
- Right inferior prefrontal cortex (RIPC)
- Bilateral anterior frontal cortex
- Posterior medial parietal cortex
- Bilateral lateral parietal cortex
- Bilateral superior prefrontal cortex
- Supramarginal gyrus
- Superior temporal gyrus
- Supplementary motor area
- Left insular cortex

It was also shown that in TOT state the activation of the parahippocampal gyrus is decreased.

Not much is known about the exact function of these areas in the tip-of-the-tongue phenomenon. The areas activated during TOT may vary depending on the nature of the target word. For example, if the target word is a person's name, the fusiform face area will likely show activation as the rememberer processes the person's face. Problems like this make it difficult to determine what areas are specifically implicated in TOT states, and which are a byproduct of other cognitive functions. However, some inferences can be made about the roles of these structures based on theories of their functions derived from other studies of these structures, unrelated to TOT. It is hypothesized that the anterior cingulate cortex and the right dorsolateral prefrontal cortex operate as a circuit to detect conflict, and may perform this role in detecting the conflict between the feeling of knowing the target word and the recall failure. The anterior cingulate cortex is also implicated in emotion and may show activation because of the emotional response to the tip of the tongue state. The posterior medial parietal cortex, bilateral lateral parietal cortex, and the bilateral superior prefrontal cortex are involved in retrieval and evaluation, and therefore may play a role in the metacognitive processes involved in the tip of the tongue phenomenon such as the evaluation of one's own knowledge and the probability of retrieval.

== Influential factors ==
=== Effects of bilingualism ===
There is a significant difference in the amount of TOTs experienced by monolinguals and bilinguals. Bilinguals seem to report the same amount of TOTs as monolinguals for proper names but significantly more TOTs for other words. Specifically, when adjusted for the degree of use of the dominant and less-dominant language, bilinguals have more TOTs with the less-dominant language. In a task of picture-naming, bilingual speakers were slower than monolinguals, even when they could use their first and dominant language. This could possibly be the result of bilinguals using the words less often than monolingual speakers. Bilinguals also represent virtually twice as many words and additional cognitive mechanisms for activation and inactivation of languages. Such mechanisms introduce added processing burden that monolinguals do not face. In addition, even when a task seems monolingual, the bilingual system is never functionally "off."

=== Effects of drugs ===
==== Lorazepam ====
Lorazepam is a type of benzodiazepine, a psychoactive drug used for the short-term treatment of anxiety, insomnia, acute seizures inducing a state of sedation in hospitalized patients, as well as sedation of aggressive patients. Research has been conducted to investigate the effects of lorazepam on TOT states in response to general knowledge question. In a recall task, participants who received lorazepam showed the same number of total recall answers to participants who had not received lorazepam. However, the lorazepam participants produced more incorrect recall responses to their TOT states. Lorazepam may inhibit the retrieval of the correct response. Participants under the influence of lorazepam did not experience the subjective feeling that they were in a TOT state (i.e., the feeling of being on the verge of recalling the word). These participants experienced the subjective feeling of a TOT state only after they were told that their response was incorrect. As a result, it appears that these participants are not aware that their answer is incorrect and only experience the subjective feeling of TOT states if they are told their answer is incorrect. Lorazepam may create conditions where alternative answers come to mind more easily. Furthermore, lorazepam suppresses emotions, which may be why participants taking this drug do not experience the subjective feelings that accompany TOT states; thus enabling the recall of alternative responses. These findings suggest that lorazepam does not increase the probability of TOT states but it does inhibit the retrieval of correct responses and the subjective feeling of TOT states, leading participants to give incorrect answers without being aware.

==== Caffeine ====
Caffeine can have multiple effects at the cellular level but is primarily notable for the alertness effect that it has on people. Research has been performed involving phonological priming and TOTs in which participants took either 200 mg of caffeine or a placebo. The participants answered 100 general knowledge questions, each with one correct answer. For each question, participants read 10 priming words that were displayed on a monitor for a short period of time. Each list of 10 priming words had between two and eight words that were phonologically related to the correct answer of the question, with the remaining words being unrelated. Caffeinated participants had fewer TOT experiences than the placebo group, suggesting better memory recall. However, in the unrelated condition, the caffeinated group did not do as well as the placebo group in their ability to retrieve words. The results suggest that this dose of caffeine (equivalent to two cups of coffee) can temporarily hinder a person's short-term recall of certain words. Moreover, the general advantageous effect of caffeine on attention can be ruled out.

=== Effects of age ===
Age is an important factor when considering TOT states. Throughout adulthood, the frequency of TOTs increases, especially during the advanced years. Compared with young adults, older adults generally report having more TOT states, fewer alternate words, and less phonological information about the target word. The underpinnings of TOT with regard to age have focused on neurological brain differences. Current research using neuroimaging compared the brain patterns of younger and older individuals experiencing TOT states. It appears that both older and younger individuals employ a similar network of brain regions during TOT states such as the prefrontal cortex, left insula, and sensorimotor cortex. However, older individuals show differences in activity in some areas compared to younger individuals. TOTs increase with age-related gray matter loss in the left insula for older individuals. This is accompanied by less activity in the left insula and is related to higher frequency of TOTs. Furthermore, it was found that older individuals have over-activation in their prefrontal cortex when experiencing TOT states. This may indicate a continued search when the retrieval process fails and a TOT state is experienced. More specifically, greater activation in the sensorimotor cortex in older individuals and less in younger adults may reflect differences in the knowledge that is used to retrieve the target information. Priming words during word retrieval tests generally reduces the frequency of TOTs and improves the retrieval of the target word and has been shown to have a larger benefit for older adults. This is consistent with the spreading activation model, where neural connections are strengthened when used more. Although older people experience more tip of the tongue states more often than any other category, recent studies have shown that frequent tip of the tongue states are not linked at all to dementia, which is common in the elderly. Despite the association of increased age with lower levels of episodic memory and more frequent TOT states, the two phenomena seem to be largely independent of one another.

=== Effects of emotion ===
It is well documented that emotion influences many memory variables such as the amount of memory recalled and attributions of nostalgia. The issue regarding emotion and TOT is how it influences the tip-of-the-tongue state and the information that is trying to be recalled. It is common for individuals to ascribe emotions to TOTs. It is suggested that the majority of individuals experience TOTs negatively. It has been shown that experiencing an emotion predicts TOT memory performance later. Emotional TOTs are more likely to be recalled later than TOTs that had no emotional experience attached. Emotion and TOT are related to the metacognitive theory that is mentioned above. In this theory, TOTs inform the cognitive system if the information one is trying to recall is accessible. Thus, emotions may play a role in experiencing TOT. Some research has shown that questions that elicit emotional arousal create TOTs more so than questions that are not emotionally arousing. It has also been found that emotional arousal can extend to subsequent questions or information being recalled even if they are not emotionally arousing themselves. It was found that emotional arousal increased the likelihood of experiencing TOT. Neuroimaging has also found activation in some areas that are associated with emotion; specifically in the anterior cingulate cortex.

=== Effects of disorders ===
If the inability to recall words, phrases, or names is a temporary but debilitating disorder, it is known as lethologica.

==== Anomic aphasia ====
Anomic aphasia is the inability to recall words and names and is a common symptom of patients with aphasia and Alzheimer's disease (AD). Research has been conducted to find out how these particular diseases affect TOTs in these individuals. In a study by Beeson, Holland, and Murray (1997), participants with Alzheimer's disease and three classic aphasic syndromes (Broca's, anomic, and conduction aphasia) were instructed to name famous people. Those with anomic aphasia showed to be superior to the other groups in their ability to name famous people that were presented. This finding was expected as the group has relatively mild aphasia. However, the Broca's conduction and AD groups did not differ in immediate or delayed naming of famous faces. All of the groups provided some basic identifying semantic information for at least half of the items presented, suggesting a fair number of items potentially in TOT. Conduction and Broca's groups showed strongest evidence of TOT, performing better than the other groups in identification of initial letters.

==== Dyslexia ====
Dyslexia, which is a reading disability in which a person is unable to read and interpret words, letters, and symbols, has also been known to have an effect on the frequency of TOT experiences. In one study, dyslexic children experienced TOT states more often than children who read normally as well as showed "more errors in the phonological ... step of word retrieval." However, dyslexic children were still able to recall the semantic meaning behind each word that induced a TOT state.

=== Effects of priming ===
Research on priming and practice use single word tests to assess for the presence of TOT states. The first letter of the target word or a similar-sounding word is given in order to prime for the target word. Evidence that comes from the usefulness of priming and practice in reducing TOT states is that most information in TOT states is low-frequency; that is, it has not been used or recalled for some time. The recency of information use can influence the retrieval process of that information. The presentation of a prime is only needed once for it to facilitate TOT state resolution. Support for priming has been found in that when individuals are given the first letter of the word they are trying to recall, they are more likely to overcome their TOT state. When the prime word has similar phonology to the target word, an increase in the frequency of TOT states and a higher frequency of correctly recalled words when the TOT state is resolved is observed. Incorrect words come to mind involuntarily that share similar phonological features with the target word. Thus, phonological similarity can both decrease and increase TOT states. However, it is possible to fix this problem by changing the syntactic class of the priming word. Priming words that are in the same syntactic class as the target word create no difference in TOT state resolution. The TOT state resolution was the same for priming words in the same syntactic class and unrelated priming words. If the priming word is being listed in conjunction with other unrelated priming words, then the position is of importance. The earlier in the list the priming word is, the less likely it is to help resolve the TOT state.

=== Effects of gestures ===
It is unknown whether gesturing is helpful in finding the elusive word in a TOT experience. It is difficult to determine if the participant is using gestures as their regular form of communication or if they are using gestures in order to help them overcome their TOT experience and retrieve the target word.

=== Effects of age of acquisition ===
The speed and accuracy with which speakers retrieve a word is influenced by the age in life at which that word was first learned. Specifically, early-acquired words tend to be named more quickly and accurately than late-acquired words (age of acquisition effect). It has been observed that the probability of experiencing a TOT state depends on the age at which the word is acquired in life: more TOT states are obtained with late-acquired than with early-acquired words.

== See also ==
- Memory and aging
- Psycholinguistics
- Neurolinguistics
- Metamemory
- Aphasia and in particular anomic aphasia
- Neuroanatomy of memory
- TOTimal
- Presque vu
