= TOTimal =

A TOTimal is a drawing or picture of a fictitious animal used to stimulate tip-of-the-tongue (or TOT) events. TOTimals generally combine features of many different animals, creating a familiar feel, while still making it impossible to identify the animal.
