= Outcome primacy =

Psychological phenomenon

'Outcome primacy' is a psychological phenomenon that describes lasting effects on a subject's behavior based on the outcome of first experiences with a given task or decision. It was found that this outcome primacy can account for much of the underweighting of rare events in experience based decisions, where participants apparently underestimate small probabilities (in contrast to prospect theory where people tend to overestimate low probabilities, when lotteries are described).

== Modelling ==
Behaviour in this task can be modelled using a standard, model-free reinforcement learning algorithm. In this model, the values of the different actions are learned over time and are used to determine the next action according to a predefined action-selection rule. It was shown that a substantial effect of first experience on behaviour is consistent with the reinforcement learning model if one assumes that the outcome of first experience resets the values of the experienced actions, but not if symmetric initial conditions are assumed. Moreover, the predictive power of the resetting model outperforms previously published models regarding the aggregate choice behaviour.

== Relation to other form of primacy ==
These findings suggest that first experience has a disproportionately large effect on subsequent actions, similar to primacy effects in other fields of cognitive psychology, such as in the application of the serial position effect. The mechanism of resetting of the initial conditions that underlies outcome primacy may thus also account for other forms of primacy.
