= Anchoring effect =

Tendency to base judgments on an irrelevant anchor

The anchoring effect is a psychological phenomenon in which an individual's judgments or decisions are influenced by a reference point or "anchor" which can be completely irrelevant.

The original description of the anchoring effect came from psychophysics. When judging stimuli along a continuum, it was noticed that the first and last stimuli were used to compare the other stimuli (this is also referred to as "end anchoring"). This concept was notably formalized in behavioral economics by Amos Tversky and Daniel Kahneman. In their seminal 1974 work, they described anchoring as a heuristic used to make estimates under uncertainty.

Both numeric and non-numeric anchoring have been reported through research. In numeric anchoring, once the value of the anchor is set, subsequent arguments, estimates, etc. made by an individual may change from what they would have otherwise been without the anchor. For example, an individual may be more likely to purchase a car if it is placed alongside a more expensive model (the anchor). Non-numeric anchoring has been observed in physical judgments involving length, weight, and volume.

== Experimental findings ==
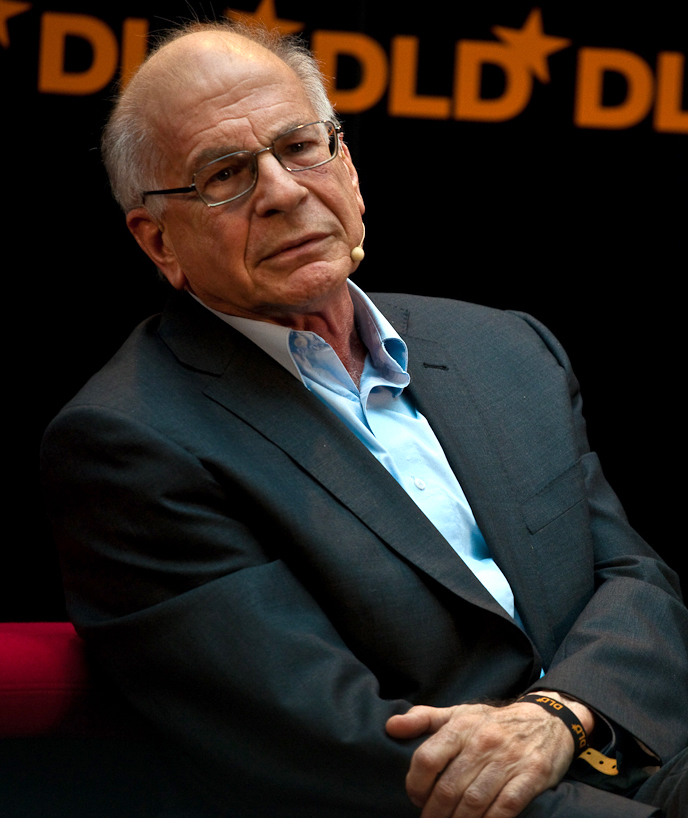
Daniel Kahneman, one of the first researchers to study anchoring

The anchoring and adjustment heuristic was first theorized by Amos Tversky and Daniel Kahneman. In one of their first studies, participants were separated into one of two conditions, and either asked to compute, within 5 seconds, the product of the numbers one through to eight, either as 1 × 2 × 3 × 4 × 5 × 6 × 7 × 8 or reversed as 8 × 7 × 6 × 5 × 4 × 3 × 2 × 1. Because participants did not have enough time to calculate the full answer, they had to make an estimate after their first few multiplications. When these first multiplications gave a small answer – because the sequence started with small numbers – the median estimate was 512; when the sequence started with the larger numbers, the median estimate was 2,250. (The correct answer is 40,320.) In another study by Tversky and Kahneman, participants were asked to estimate the percentage of African countries in the United Nations. Before estimating, the participants first observed a roulette wheel that was predetermined to stop on either 10 or 65. Participants whose wheel stopped on 10 guessed lower values (25% on average) than participants whose wheel stopped at 65 (45% on average). The pattern has held in other experiments for a wide variety of different subjects of estimation.

As a second example, in a study by Dan Ariely, an audience is first asked to write the last two digits of their social security number and consider whether they would pay this number of dollars for items whose value they did not know, such as wine, chocolate and computer equipment. They were then asked to bid for these items, with the result that the audience members with higher two-digit numbers would submit bids that were between 60 percent and 120 percent higher than those with the lower social security numbers, which had become their anchor. When asked if they believed the number was informative of the value of the item, quite a few said yes. Trying to avoid this confusion, a small number of studies used procedures that were clearly random, such as Excel random generator button and die roll, and failed to replicate anchoring effects.

The anchoring effect has also been documented in real estate markets. In one study in the Journal of Real Estate Research, it was established that the 2-year and 9-year highs on the Case-Shiller House Price Index could be used as anchors in predicting current house prices. The findings were used to indicate that, in forecasting house prices, these 2-year and 9-years highs might be relevant.

In behavioral finance, anchoring has been observed in stock-purchase decisions. A study found that when using an app-based stock brokerage, an investor's first stock purchase price serves as an anchor for future stock purchases. The findings indicate that when investors start by making only a small stock purchase, they end up with less accumulated investments in the long run.

== Characteristics ==
=== Difficulty of avoiding ===
Various studies have shown that anchoring is very difficult to avoid. For example, in one study students were given anchors that were wrong. They were asked whether Mahatma Gandhi died before or after age 9, or before or after age 140. Clearly neither of these anchors can be correct, but when the two groups were asked to suggest when they thought he had died, they guessed significantly differently (average age of 50 vs. average age of 67).

Other studies have tried to eliminate anchoring much more directly. In a study exploring the causes and properties of anchoring, participants were exposed to an anchor and asked to guess how many physicians were listed in the local phone book. In addition, they were explicitly informed that anchoring would "contaminate" their responses, and that they should do their best to correct for that. A control group received no anchor and no explanation. Regardless of how they were informed and whether they were informed correctly, all of the experimental groups reported higher estimates than the control group. Thus, despite being expressly aware of the anchoring effect, most participants were still unable to avoid it. A later study found that even when offered monetary incentives, most people are unable to effectively adjust from an anchor.

Although it has been found through many research and experiments that attempt to mitigate the decision heuristic of anchoring bias is either marginally significant or not successful at all, it can be found that the consider-the-opposite (COS strategy) has been the most reliable in mitigating the anchoring bias. In short, the COS strategy is proposed to an individual by asking them to consider the possibilities the opposite of their perceptions and beliefs. Therefore, depriving the individual of their preexisting attitudes and limiting the decision bias.

=== Durability of anchoring ===
Anchoring effects are also shown to remain adequately present given the accessibility of knowledge pertaining to the target. This, in turn, suggests that despite a delay in judgement towards a target, the extent of anchoring effects have seen to remain unmitigated within a given time period. A series of three experiments were conducted to test the longevity of anchoring effects. It was observed that despite a delay of one week being introduced for half the sample population of each experiment, similar results of immediate judgement and delayed judgement of the target were achieved. The experiments concluded that external information experienced within the delayed judgement period shows little influence relative to self-generated anchors even with commonly encountered targets (temperature) used in one of the experiments, showing that anchoring effects may precede priming in duration especially when the anchoring effects were formed during the task. Further research to conclude an effect that is effectively retained over a substantial period of time has proven inconsistent.

=== Pervasiveness across contexts ===
One notable characteristic of the anchoring effect is its pervasiveness across diverse judgment scenarios. Furnham and Boo (2011) highlight that anchoring occurs not only in abstract estimation tasks (like guessing the height of Mount Everest) but also in real-world contexts such as legal sentencing, consumer purchasing, salary negotiations, and forecasting. Anchoring persists even when the anchor is implausible or clearly irrelevant (e.g., spinning a random wheel), demonstrating that anchoring can operate automatically, outside of conscious awareness or logical evaluation.

=== Anchoring bias in groups ===
It is often presumed that groups come to a more unbiased decision relative to individuals. However, this assumption is supported with varied findings that could not come to a general consensus. Nevertheless, while some groups are able to perform better than an individual member, they are found to be just as biased or even more biased relative to their individual counterparts. A possible cause would be the discriminatory fashion in which information is communicated, processed and aggregated based on each individual's anchored knowledge and belief. This results in a diminished quality in the decision-making process and consequently, amplifies the pre-existing anchored biases.

The cause of group anchoring remains unsure. Group anchors may have been established at the group level or may simply be the culmination of several individual's personal anchors. Prior studies have shown that when given an anchor before the experiment, individual members consolidated the respective anchors to attain a decision in the direction of the anchor placed. However, a distinction between individual and group-based anchor biases does exist, with groups tending to ignore or disregard external information due to the confidence in the joint decision-making process. The presence of pre-anchor preferences also impeded the extent to which external anchors affected the group decision, as groups tend to allocate more weight to self-generated anchors, according to the 'competing anchor hypothesis'.

Recently, it has been suggested that the group member who speaks first often has an unproportionally high impact on the final decision. A series of experiments were conducted to investigate anchoring bias in groups and possible solutions to avoid or mitigate anchoring. The first experiment established that groups are indeed influenced by anchors while the other two experiments highlighted methods to overcome group anchoring bias. Methods that were utilized include the use of process accountability and motivation through competition instead of cooperation to reduce the influence of anchors within groups.

=== Susceptibility in automated systems ===
Even advanced technologies cannot prevent users from being influenced by anchoring. A peer-reviewed study sought to investigate the effect of business intelligence (BI) systems on the anchoring effect. Business intelligence denotes an array of software and services used by businesses to gather valuable insights into an organisation's performance. The extent to which cognitive bias is mitigated by using such systems was the overarching question in this study. While the independent variable was the use of the BI system, the dependent variable was the outcome of the decision-making process. The subjects were presented with a 'plausible' anchor and a 'spurious' anchor in a forecasting decision. It was found that, while the BI system mitigated the negative effects of the spurious anchor, it had no influence on the effects of the plausible anchor. This is important in a business context, because it shows that humans are still susceptible to cognitive biases, even when using sophisticated technological systems. One of the subsequent recommendations from the experimenters was to implement a forewarning into BI systems as to the anchoring effect.

== Causes ==
The present literature does not reach a consensus as to the cause of anchoring. However, scholars agree that anchoring is a phenomenon that can be easily demonstrated but is hard to explain. Some scholars suggest that anchoring is, in fact, caused by a combination of factors.

=== Anchoring-and-adjusting ===
The most prevalent explanation of the anchoring effect is the argument originally made by Tversky and Kahneman, termed anchoring-and-adjusting. Based on this theory, individuals set an anchor according to available information, whether it is provided or individuals already have an anchor in mind, and use this anchor as a point of reference to adjust their answers. This theory explains inaccuracy in guessing by suggesting that people adjust insufficiently, rendering their final guess closer to the anchors. This phenomenon was further investigated in other studies and used as an explanation for biases such as hindsight bias and egocentric bias.

For instance, when asked to guess the price of a drink in a coffee shop, individuals often look for the price of other drinks or recall the price of similar drinks at other stores, and base their answer on the anchor that they set. Specifically, the original study found that by simply providing an arbitrary anchor to each group, people provided significantly different responses, suggesting that their answers were generated through anchoring and adjusting. In addition, this finding suggests that individuals are gullible when setting an anchor, and almost automatically begin the anchoring-and-adjusting process.

On the other hand, Epley and Gilovich found that when anchors are self-generated, people will stop adjusting once they believe they have adjusted their answers to an acceptable range. Although this process does not guarantee insufficient adjustments, it does result in an answer that is as close to the anchor as possible in the acceptable range. However, insufficient adjustments are diminished when individuals are able and motivated by external factors, such as monetary compensation, to continue adjusting for a more accurate answer, thereby reducing the anchoring effect. The anchoring effect is also reduced when individuals know which way to adjust from the anchor because it eliminates the possible answers by half.

Besides general knowledge, anchoring is also observed in social settings. The simulation theory of empathy suggests that people use their own mental state and reasoning to infer the actions of others. People assume that those who are similar to us will act in a similar way. Aligned with this idea, Tamir and Mitchell found that judgments of the attitude of others are made more quickly for those who are similar to the judge, and greater self-other discrepancy resulted in longer reaction time. In this case, individuals use their own attitudes as an anchor and make adjustments to predict the attitude of others. Note that this process only takes place when the judge perceives great similarity between self and others.

Overall, this theory describes the process of anchoring and adjusting away from the anchor, as well as the phenomenon of inaccurate responses due to insufficient adjusting. However, proponents of alternative theories argued that adjusting is only possible when the original anchor lies outside the acceptable range. According to Epley and Gilovich, individuals will not adjust at all and give an answer that is identical to their anchor if the anchor is already within the acceptable range. Using the previous example, the actual price of the drink can be identical to other drinks served at that store, meaning that people should theoretically consider their anchor as a potential answer rather than adjusting. When a reasonable anchor is given, there will be no adjustment. Therefore, this theory does not explain all cases of anchoring.

=== Selective accessibility ===
An alternative explanation of the anchoring effect is the idea that the accessibility of anchor-consistent information is enhanced when individuals consider it as a potential answer. After determining that the initial anchor is not the correct answer, they move on to consider other possibilities. However, because the anchor was just made salient and accessible to them, they will take the anchor into consideration while evaluating other possibilities. As a result, this comparative assessment can result in answers that are disproportionally consistent with the anchor. In this sense, anchoring is a special case of semantic priming, where the anchor acts as the prime.

Unlike anchoring-and-adjusting, this theory suggests that people consider the relevant attributes of the initial anchor to determine if the anchor is plausible. Rather than accepting any plausible anchor as their answer and insufficiently adjusting anchors outside of the acceptable range, people will remain motivated to find a more accurate answer after rejecting the initial anchor. The preceding adjustments that individuals make are relevant to the anchor because people evaluate hypotheses through attempting to confirm them. In line with this idea, when investigating whether the plausibility of an anchor affects comparative and absolute judgments, Strack and Mussweiler found that individuals take longer to provide an absolute judgment when the anchor is implausible. Comparative judgments refer to the process of using an anchor to determine the final answer. Most paradigms used in anchoring studies also ask participants to provide an absolute judgment (i.e., provide a concrete number as their answer) after comparative judgments. When plausible anchors were used in comparative judgments, the anchor became more accessible, shortening the response time for consequent absolute judgments. In contrast, implausible anchors result in longer response time because there is no relevant information that can be used as primes.

Although selective accessibility and anchoring-and-adjusting provide conflicting explanations for the anchoring effect, some scholars have argued that anchoring is influenced by multiple factors, and these theories complement each other in explaining the anchoring effect. For instance, Simmons and colleagues proposed an integrative theory suggesting that an anchor can result in selective reliance on anchor-consistent information, rendering the range of plausible answers closer to the anchor. On the other hand, people adjust away from (or possibly back toward) anchors before settling on their final estimate. This integrative theory is more parsimonious because it suggests that neither the source of the anchor (self-generated or provided) nor the plausibility of the anchor has a significant effect on judgments.

=== Attitude change ===
On the contrary of the two previous theories, the attitude change view suggests that individuals' attitude towards an anchor, specifically provided anchors, can heavily affect the extent of the anchoring effect. Recall that individuals often seek to confirm their hypothesis rather than objectively evaluating all information. When individuals disagree with the provided anchor, they will selectively seek evidence that supports their own attitudes instead of the provided anchor, resulting in an unobserved anchoring effect. This theory highlights the idea that the distinct anchoring effect observed with self-generated and provided anchors roots from individual attitude (i.e., does the individual believe in the anchor) rather than the anchors themselves, supporting the integrative theory proposed by Simmons and colleagues. Furthermore, supporters of this view have argued that attitude change is an alternative explanation of the anchoring effect. Providing an anchor generates favorable attitudes in individuals toward the anchor, biasing consequent judgments.

=== Extremeness aversion ===
Extremeness aversion is a robust phenomenon where people try to avoid the extremes during decision-making, such as selecting the middle options more often than other extreme options and avoiding reporting the maximum or minimum on a Likert scale. This desire to avoid extremes is at least partially responsible for the anchoring effect. For instance, upon setting an anchor, participants who were told they could adjust up to 6 units made significantly smaller adjustments compared to those who were told that they could adjust up to 15 units, suggesting that people avoid extremes when making decisions. Importantly, the maximum allowable adjustment acted as an anchor that affected the final judgment, highlighting the prevalent aversion to extremes. As a result, the final judgment is close to the anchor because people do not want to adjust too close to the extremes.

=== Neuroscience basis ===
Some research has explored neural mechanisms underlying the anchoring effect. Studies of individual differences report that mixed-handed individuals show larger anchoring effects than strongly handed individuals, a pattern consistent with differences in interhemispheric interaction. Electrophysiological work provides additional evidence: EEG studies suggest that externally presented anchors function as semantic primes that shape the cognitive and affective context in which judgments are formed. Higher anchors are associated with increased P2 and late positive potential (LPP) amplitudes, indicating greater anticipatory attention and expectations of stronger or more aversive outcomes. Research using EEG and fMRI in management-related judgment tasks further shows that anchor values engage distinct semantic and evaluative networks. Higher anchors produce stronger EEG power in value-judgment stages, and fMRI experiments reveal different reaction-time profiles and neural activation patterns for feasible, infeasible, and no-anchor conditions during both comparison and decision phases.

== Influencing factors ==
=== Cognitive ability ===
The impact of cognitive ability on anchoring is contested. Predrag Teovanović's investigated whether intelligence, cognitive reflection and personality traits affects the presence of anchoring effect in decision-making. Although measures of individual differences in susceptibility to anchoring were reliable, individual differences only explain a small portion of the variation. However, intelligence is negatively correlated with anchoring for participants who are more reflective. By critically thinking about their process of decision-making, reflective individuals might realize the unreasonable reliance on anchors and insufficient adjustments. Similarly, Welsh and colleagues found a weak, negative correlation between aptitude for rationality and overall cognitive measures and anchoring susceptibility. A study on willingness to pay for consumer goods found that anchoring decreased in those with greater cognitive ability, though it did not disappear. Research supporting individual differences in anchoring suggests that individuals who recognize the potential bias of anchoring and actively reflect on their decision-making process tend to be less susceptible to its effects. By critically assessing whether their judgments are based on reliable data or influenced by arbitrary anchors, they are more likely to identify and correct for insufficient adjustments, or choose not to use unreliable anchors at all.

Another study, however, found that cognitive ability had no significant effect on how likely people were to use anchoring. In a poker-like experiment that included people of differing academic achievement and psychometric reasoning scoring, it has been found that anchoring is not related to education level. It also found that numerical reasoning and reflection scores had a negative association with anchoring susceptibility.

=== Overconfidence ===
Overconfidence is significantly associated with the anchoring effect. It refers specifically to the tendency for individuals to place excessive weight on their initial estimates and insufficient weight on new information leading to cognitive conceit. Cognitive conceit or overconfidence arises from other factors like personal cognitive attributes such as knowledge and decision-making ability, decreasing the probability to pursue external sources of confirmation. This factor has also been shown to arise with tasks with greater difficulty. Even within subject matter experts, they were also prey to such behaviour of overconfidence and should more so, actively reduce such behaviour. Following the study of estimations under uncertain, despite several attempts to curb overconfidence proving unsuccessful, Tversky and Kahneman suggest an effective solution to overconfidence is for subjects to explicitly establish anchors to help reduce overconfidence in their estimates.

=== Personality ===
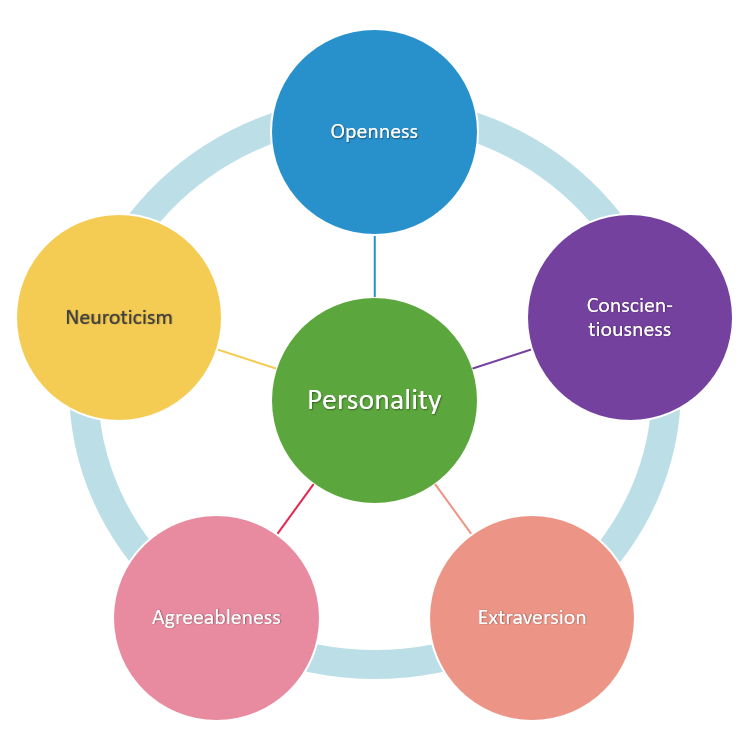
The Big Five personality traits

Correlational research on anchoring bias and personality traits yielded mixed results, with emphasis on the Big Five personality traits which includes: Conscientiousness (orderly and responsible), neuroticism (uneasy and anxious), extraversion (sociable and outgoing), openness (intelligence and creativity) and agreeableness (polite and trusting). One study found that participants who were high in the Openness trait were more influenced by anchors set by others when estimating the length of the Mississippi river, with no other personality traits correlating to the effects of anchoring. Other research showed that it was conscientiousness and agreeableness that increased anchoring biases, while anchoring effects were diminished in participants high in the extraversion trait. Nonetheless, when measuring the Big Five personality traits and anchoring susceptibility, no significant correlation was found between personality and anchoring. The anchoring effect seems to be present regardless of personality.

=== Personal experience ===
Early research found that experts (those with high knowledge, experience, or expertise in some field) were more resistant to the anchoring effect. However, anchoring happens unconsciously which means that unless someone who is knowledgeable is warned prior, they are still susceptible to anchoring. Since then, however, numerous studies have demonstrated that while experience can sometimes reduce the effect, even experts are susceptible to anchoring. In a study concerning the effects of anchoring on judicial decisions, researchers found that even experienced legal professionals were affected by anchoring. This remained true even when the anchors provided were arbitrary and unrelated to the case in question. Also, this relates to goal setting, where more experienced individuals will set goals based on their past experiences which consequently affects end results in negotiations.

Expertise is typically defined as domain-specific knowledge and experience. In a study using price estimation of cars, it was found that relevant knowledge positively influenced anchoring. Expertise in cognitive bias is related to experience however the two are not exclusively exhaustive. In a study using stock return estimates, it was found that expertise decreases behavioural bias significantly. It was found that other factors like cognitive ability and experience where there is no susceptibility to anchoring or a susceptibility as it increases, tend to become factors that decrease the effects of anchoring when they are an expert.

=== Motivation/rewards ===
The motivation to be accurate in one's judgements seem to have mixed effects on the strength of anchoring. On one hand, According to Wegener's attitude change theory, it was widely accepted that the prevalent effects of anchoring was due to the pathway of low-elaboration, non-thoughtful processes. The lack of reward or consequences results in the assumption that anchors are a reasonable hint to the correct answer without considering contextual differences, categorical differences, or even the relevance of the anchor. There is also evidence that the effects of anchoring is diminished when there is prior warning about the phenomenon of insufficient adjustment and self-generated anchors.

However, there is also conflicting evidence where increases in motivation does not correlate to a lowered rate of anchoring. There were no differences in the effects of anchoring when comparing participants who were offered monetary rewards for accurate answers to those who weren't. Moreover, findings by Wilson et al. (1996) concluded that incentives and forewarnings did not eliminate anchoring effects.

This could be explained by high elaborative anchoring - When motivated to be accurate, participants engage in more cognitively demanding thought processes, searching for existing information, including prior experiences and established anchors. The high need for accuracy lead to more effortful thought processes, and putting a heavier emphasis on anchors since they are representations of prior knowledge in what we perceive as similar categories. Findings have demonstrated that both a high and low need to be accurate result in susceptibility to the influence of anchoring effects, even when one is motivated to explicitly avoid them.

=== Mood ===
A wide range of research has linked sad or depressed moods with more extensive and accurate evaluation of problems. As a result of this, earlier studies hypothesized that people with more depressed moods would tend to use anchoring less than those with happier moods. However, more recent studies have shown the opposite effect: sad people are more likely to use anchoring than people with happy or neutral mood. In a study focusing on medical practitioners, it was found that physicians that possess positive moods are less susceptible to anchoring bias, when compared to physicians with neutral moods. Researchers suggested that positive mood promotes more systematic information processing, which can reduce susceptibility to anchoring.

=== Culture ===
Culture has been identified as an influencing factor in susceptibility to the anchoring effect. Research distinguishes between the holistic thinking style, predominant in East and Southeast Asian cultures, and the analytic thinking style, common in Western cultures. A study comparing students from Poland and India found that while both groups were affected by anchoring, the degree of susceptibility varied significantly by cultural background. Polish students demonstrated lower susceptibility to anchoring compared to Indian students. Additionally, cultural differences in overconfidence were observed, with Indian students displaying a higher rate of overprecision compared to Polish students. This is explained by the cultural difference in tolerances for ambiguity and risk (uncertainty avoidance), with Poland scoring high and India scoring medium to low on Hofstede's Uncertainty Avoidance Index (UAI).

== Applications ==
=== Anchoring in negotiation ===
In the negotiation process anchoring serves to determine an accepted starting point for the subsequent negotiations. As soon as one side states their first price offer, the (subjective) anchor is set. The counterbid (counter-anchor) is the second-anchor.

In addition to the initial research conducted by Tversky and Kahneman, multiple other studies have shown that anchoring can greatly influence the estimated value of an object. For instance, although negotiators can generally appraise an offer based on multiple characteristics, studies have shown that they tend to focus on only one aspect. In this way, a deliberate starting point can strongly affect the range of possible counteroffers. The process of offer and counteroffer results in a mutually beneficial arrangement. However, multiple studies have shown that initial offers have a stronger influence on the outcome of negotiations than subsequent counteroffers. Delaume suggests that buyers and sellers can compete to be the first to propose an offer, because the initial offer's anchoring role gives the offerer an advantage.

An example of the power of anchoring has been conducted during the Strategic Negotiation Process Workshops. During the workshop, a group of participants is divided into two sections: buyers and sellers. Each side receives identical information about the other party before going into a one-on-one negotiation. Following this exercise, both sides debrief about their experiences. The results show that where the participants anchor the negotiation had a significant effect on their success.

Anchoring affects everyone, even people who are highly knowledgeable in a field. Northcraft and Neale conducted a study to measure the difference in the estimated value of a house between students and real-estate agents. In this experiment, both groups were shown a house and then given different listing prices. After making their offer, each group was then asked to discuss what factors influenced their decisions. In the follow-up interviews, the real-estate agents denied being influenced by the initial price, but the results showed that both groups were equally influenced by that anchor.

Anchoring can have more subtle effects on negotiations as well. Janiszewski and Uy investigated the effects of precision of an anchor. Participants read an initial price for a beach house, then gave the price they thought it was worth. They received either a general, seemingly nonspecific anchor (e.g., $800,000) or a more precise and specific anchor (e.g., $799,800). Participants with a general anchor adjusted their estimate more than those given a precise anchor ($751,867 vs $784,671). The authors propose that this effect comes from difference in scale; in other words, the anchor affects not only the starting value, but also the starting scale. When given a general anchor of $20, people will adjust in large increments ($19, $21, etc.), but when given a more specific anchor like $19.85, people will adjust on a lower scale ($19.75, $19.95, etc.). Thus, a more specific initial price will tend to result in a final price closer to the initial one.

As for the question of setting the first or second anchor, the party setting the second anchor has the advantage in that the counter-anchor determines the point midway between both anchors. Due to a possible lack of knowledge the party setting the first anchor can also set it too low, i.e. against their own interests. Generally negotiators who set the first anchor also tend to be less satisfied with the negotiation outcome, than negotiators who set the counter-anchor. This may be due to the regret or sense that they did not achieve or rather maximise the full potential of the negotiations. However, studies suggest that negotiators who set the first offer frequently achieve economically more advantageous results.

=== Anchoring in pricing ===
According to the theory, consumers' shopping experiences are influenced by factors such as time restriction and specific environment. Enterprises design would set anchor values for consumers in order to get them to buy the products. When persuading consumers to purchase a particular product, sellers might use anchoring. Sellers often influence consumers' price perception by anchoring a high reference price and that is an anchor value. Following are three ways to set the anchor value for consumers.

==== Sorting the prices of products ====
Sellers usually sort the prices of products from high to low and this method is commonly seen on the menus of restaurants. The high prices at the top of the menu act as anchor values in this situation. Consumers will have an expectation that the products are all expensive when knowing the relatively high prices of products on the top of the list. As a result, they will be pleased to see the cheaper products at the middle and bottom of the list and regard these prices as acceptable or cheaper than expected. Therefore, they are more likely to buy these products.

==== Decoy ====
Decoy effect is defined as a situation where people tend to have a change in preference between two choices when they are showed with a third choice. The third choice is called a decoy which is designed to induce consumers to change their preferences. The decoy is usually considered as inferior. For example, it might be more expensive than option A while having lower quality than option B. In this case, the anchor is the decoy.

One decoy effect example is the bundle sales. For example, many restaurants often sell set meals to their consumers, while simultaneously having the meals' components sold separately. The prices of the meals' components are the decoy pricing and act as an anchor which enables to make the set meal more valuable to consumers. With the decoy effect it generates, the anchor increases consumers' willingness to pay for the set meals, or the mixed bundles.

==== Incidental prices ====
Incidental price is defined as the prices offered or showed by a seller for products which the consumers are not interested in. According to the theory, the incidental price serves as an anchor which increases consumers' willingness to pay. This effect has been widely used in areas such as auctions, online vendors and retailers.

== See also ==
- Bandwagon effect
- Confirmation bias
- Framing effect
- Law of the instrument
- List of cognitive biases
- Matthew effect
- Negotiation strategies
- Poisoning the well
- Primacy effect
