= Law of primacy in persuasion =

Psychological hypothesis

In persuasive communication, the order of the information's presentation influences opinion formation. The law of primacy in persuasion, otherwise known as a primacy effect, as postulated by Frederick Hansen Lund in 1925 holds that the side of an issue presented first will have greater effectiveness in persuasion than the side presented subsequently. Lund presented college students with a document in support of one side of a controversial issue and then presented a second document which supported the opposite position. He found the document read first had greater influence, regardless of which position it expressed. This empirical evidence was generally accepted until 1950, when Cromwell published findings of the opposite: a recency effect in which arguments presented later had greater effectiveness in persuasion than arguments presented first. It now appears that both primacy and recency effects occur in persuasion.

== Theoretical background ==
There are many different theoretical models proposed to explain the occurrence of primacy and recency effects.

=== Sensory-variation ===
Schultz (1963) developed the "sensory-variation" hypothesis for order effects, which suggests that humans seek high activation and will respond to novel stimuli more strongly than to stimuli they are familiar with. Novel stimuli should provide higher activation than familiar information, according to this theory. Shultz developed four postulates from this general hypothesis:

1. When a person encounters a topic for the first time, the communication is perceived as novel and causes high activation. Any subsequent communication on the same topic produces less activation, and so the person will react according to the initial communication in an attempt to experience the higher activation. A primacy effect should be observed in this scenario.
2. If the person is allowed to record his opinion after each communication, the person will respond more to the communication that he encounters either second in a group of two or last in a group of three or more in order to maintain a high level of activation. Therefore, a recency effect is hypothesized.
3. When a time delay or another task is inserted between the two communications, the higher level of activation will be dissipated by the time the second communication occurs. The second communication acts as a novel stimulus in this scenario. Either a recency effect or no order effect will occur in this scenario.
4. When communications are familiar, such as social issues or current issues, the first communication will not produce activation that is less than the activation for unfamiliar communication. However, some aspect of the communication may be novel, and so there may be some increased activation. Therefore, either a small primacy effect or no order effect will be demonstrated.

=== Attention decrement ===
Anderson (1981) theorized that order effects occur due to "attention decrement". According to this theory, when the first piece of information is presented about an opinion, people tend to pay less attention to subsequent information that may provide evidence to the contrary opinion. Therefore, people's opinions about something are influenced strongly by the information that they paid attention to, which was the first information presented to them. This model of "attention decrement" predicts a primacy effect in opinion formation.

=== The belief-adjustment model ===
Hogarth and Einhorn (1992) proposed the belief-adjustment model to try to predict in which situations order effects would occur and what specific order effect will occur. According to Hogarth and Einhorn, early information forms an initial impression, which is called an anchor. This anchor is then adjusted as new information is processed. This model predicts order effects based on the type of mental processing that is used for the new information. For end-of-sequence processing, or processing that occurs once all of the information has been presented, the model predicts primacy effects. The initial piece of information serves as the anchor, and subsequent pieces of information are aggregated together to adjust the initial piece of information. Therefore, the initial piece of information is weighted more than subsequent pieces of information, leading to a primacy effect.

However, when processing changes to step-by-step processing, or processing that occurs after each new piece of information, recency effects are predicted. Each new piece of information received will be processed separately. This new piece of information will then become the new anchor, which forms a new impression. Beliefs are being adjusted with the processing of each new anchor, which leads to more weight being placed to the information most recently received. Therefore, recency effects are predicted to occur when information is processed in a step-by-step manner.

== Factors that moderate order effects ==
There are factors that can moderate the occurrence of order effects. Moderating factors affect the likelihood of order effects occurring.

=== Need for cognition ===
Need for cognition moderates the occurrence of order effects. Kassin, Reddy, and Tulloch (1990) demonstrated that a juror's need for cognition affects which order effect the juror relies on for their vote. An ambiguous confession was played by one side of the case, and then both sides commented that the confession fit into their narrative of the crime. The side who presented the confession spoke first. Jurors who had high need for cognition were more likely to exhibit a primacy effect, meaning that they believed the confession fit with whichever side presented the confession as evidence. Conversely, jurors who had low need for cognition demonstrated a recency effect, and believed that the confession supported the case for the side who did not submit the confession.

Kassin, Reddy, and Tulloch (1990) believed that the reason for this effect was due to the nature of processing that the jurors engaged in. Jurors who were high in need for cognition actively process the information. This active processing leads to agreeing with the initial presentation of the data, and then participating in processing that confirms this agreement. However, people low in need for cognition do not process information, and therefore, rely on the information presented most recently for their opinion.

This impact of need for cognition is supported by a study conducted by Huagtvedt and Petty (1992). The experimenters played a message for two groups of people, one group that was high in need for cognition and one group that was low in need for cognition. The two groups were determined by their own need for cognition, and were not experimentally manipulated into the two groups. Initially, both groups were equally persuaded by the message. However, the two groups then listened to a weak counter-message, which was not as strong as the evidence for the initial message. The group that had high need for cognition were not persuaded by the weak counter-message, and their opinions were still in line with the initial message. The other group, the low need for cognition group, was persuaded by the new message. The high need for cognition demonstrated a primacy effect, while the low need for cognition demonstrated a recency effect.

=== Chunking ===
Chunking interacts with the order of information and need for cognition to moderate the occurrence of order effects. Petty, Tormala, Hawkins, and Wegener (2001) conducted a study which examined the effect chunking has on order effects in people with high and low need for cognition. Participants read arguments for and against an exam policy, and this information was presented as being either chunked or unchunked. When the information was chunked, those who show high need for cognition were prone to primacy effects, while those with low need for cognition were prone to recency effects. However, when the information was presented in an unchunked nature, the opposite results were found. People who had high need for cognition demonstrated recency effects, whereas people who had low need for cognition showed a primacy effect. Therefore, chunking appears to interact with need for cognition to allow for order effects to occur.

=== Familiarity of information ===
A study conducted by Lana (1961) demonstrates a moderating effect of the familiarity of information presented on order effects. In the study, a topic of initial low familiarity was used. Then, the researchers presented a long talk to well familiarize one group with the topic and a short talk to another group to gain little familiarization with the topic. A third group was then presented with no familiarization talk. Each of these three groups was then split into two subgroups, which listened to arguments for and against the topic twelve days later. One subgroup would listen to the argument for the topic first and then the argument against the topic, and the second subgroup would listen to the argument against it first. These groups then filled out a Likert scale questionnaire on their opinions on the topic. The results show that prior familiarization with a topic increased the likelihood of a primacy effect. Therefore, those in the long familiarization group had an opinion on the topic that coincided with which argument they heard first, regardless of the actual stance. However, no prior familiarization led to a recency effect to be demonstrated. Therefore, the group that was given no familiarization talk demonstrated opinions that coincided with the argument presented last to them.

=== Controversy of the topic ===
A study conducted by Lana (1963) demonstrates that the controversiality of the topic can have a moderating effect on order effects. College students and high school students read arguments for and against a controversial topic and a noncontroversial topic, and were then asked to fill out an opinion questionnaire about the topics. For college students, the controversial topic exhibited a primacy effect. College students did not exhibit any order effects for a noncontroversial topic. The college students were persuaded more by the argument they encountered first for a controversial issue, but were not influenced by the order of the presentation of arguments for noncontroversial topics. However, for high school students, no order effects were exhibited for either the controversial or noncontroversial topics. Therefore, the controversy of a topic appears to affect the role order effects play for some age groups in persuasion.

== Order effects in judgment formation ==
=== Sports ===
Smith, Greenlees, and Manley (2009) found that order effects can occur in assessment of sports ability. The researchers had participants watch a video composed of an ultimate Frisbee player performing certain skills. Two videos were shown, either in descending ability or increasing ability. The participants were then asked to make assessments of the overall ability of the players and three aspects of their ability. However, the assessments occurred at differing times in the video. One group made the assessments at the end of the video, one group made delayed assessments at the end of the video, a third group made the assessments after each skill in the video, and a fourth group that made the overall assessment after each skill but then made the assessment of the ability after viewing the entire video. Results indicate that a primacy effect was exhibited in each of the conditions, except for the third group, which did not demonstrate any order effects. The assessment of ability tended to agree with the initial ability level shown. However, the group that made assessments in an extended step-by-step manner were not influenced by the order the abilities were shown. Therefore, a primacy effect can occur in ability assessment, unless extended step-by-step processing is employed.

=== Service encounters ===
In a study conducted by Garnefeld and Steinhoff (2013), order effects were demonstrated for opinions regarding service encounters. Four groups received daily descriptions of a hypothetical hotel stay over the course of five days. One group had a very positive experience on the first day, and then a neutral to slightly positive experience for the rest of the days. The second group had a negative experience on the first day, and then a neutral to slightly positive experience for the rest of the stay. Groups three and four experienced a neutral experience for the first four days, with group three then having a positive experience on the last day and group four having a negative experience on the last day. Each group was then tested for customer satisfaction regarding their hypothetical stay. Garnefeld and Steinhoff found that the timing of positive or negative occurrences is what affected satisfaction. For negative events, a recency effect was demonstrated, meaning that negative events which occurred at the end of the stay affected customer satisfaction more than negative events at the beginning of the stay. For positive events, a primacy effect was demonstrated, which means that positive events that occurred at the beginning of the stay affected customer satisfaction more than positive events at the end of the stay. Therefore, the timing of particular types of events in extended service encounters predicts the effect of the event on satisfaction.

== Order effects in health care ==
Order effects may be used to influence a patient to receive an effective treatment that aligns with their values. One study, conducted by Bansback, Li, Lynd, and Bryan (2014), demonstrates that a primacy effect will influence the decision for treatment. The researchers presented three groups with information about sleep apnea treatments. The three groups were based on the order in which the information was presented. One group received information in an order unrelated to their values, while two groups received information ordered based on their values. One of the groups received information that aligned with their values first, and the other group received information that aligned with their values last. The researchers found that patients were more likely to choose the treatment that aligned with their values when this information was presented first, thus demonstrating a primacy effect for information on treatments that align with a patient's values. The order in which patients receive information appears to influence which treatment option they choose.

== Order effects in politics ==
=== Voter mobilization ===
In a study conducted by Panagopoulos (2010), order effects were found in terms of voter mobilization. Calls were made to residents of an American city at different times before an election. Some residents received a call 4 weeks prior to an election, some received a call two weeks prior to an election, some received a call three days before an election, and some residents did not receive a call. The call made was a nonpartisan attempt to mobilize people to vote. Results indicate that the timing of the call may not have an effect on the general voter population, but that the timing can affect certain populations and get certain populations to vote at higher rates. According to Panagopoulos, high-propensity voters, voters who typically turn out in higher numbers, voted at higher percentages when they received the call four weeks prior to the election, demonstrating a primacy effect. However, for lower propensity voters, voters who typically do not vote, calls made three days prior to the election were more effective at getting this population to vote, demonstrating a recency effect. Therefore, for voter mobilization, propensity to vote appears to be a moderating variable influencing the effect of timing of a mobilization call.

== See also ==
- Serial position effect
