= Bennet Murdock =

American psychologist (1925–2022)

- Born: October 18, 1925; New Haven, Connecticut, U.S.
- Died: March 26, 2022 (aged 96); Toronto, Ontario, Canada
- Education: Yale University
- Known for: Work on short-term memory
- Scientific career
- Fields: Psychology
- Workplaces: University of Toronto
- Thesis: The effects of failure and retroactive inhibition on mediated generalization (1951)
- Doctoral advisor: Leonard W. Doob
- Doctoral students: Stephan Lewandowsky

Bennet Bronson Murdock Jr. (October 18, 1925 – March 26, 2022) was an American psychologist known for his research on human memory, especially his pioneering research into short-term memory.

== Education ==
Murdock received his undergraduate degree and Ph.D. from Yale University, receiving the latter degree in 1951. While at Yale, he had contact with Clark L. Hull.

== Career ==
In 1965, Murdock joined the faculty of the University of Toronto, where he remained until he retired in 1991.

In 2003 Murdock was awarded the Norman Anderson Lifetime Achievement Award of the Society of Experimental Psychologists.

== Personal life and death ==
Murdock died in Toronto on March 26, 2022, at the age of 96.
