= Principles of learning =

Conditions of effective learning

Researchers in the field of educational psychology have identified several principles of learning (sometimes referred to as laws of learning) which seem generally applicable to the learning process. These principles have been discovered, tested, and applied in real-world scenarios and situations. They provide additional insight into what makes people learn most effectively. Edward Thorndike developed the first three "Laws of learning": readiness, exercise, and effect.

== Readiness ==
Since learning is an active process, students must have adequate rest, health, and physical ability. Basic needs of students must be satisfied before they are ready or capable of learning. Students who are exhausted or in ill health cannot learn much. If they are distracted by outside responsibilities, interests, or worries, have overcrowded schedules, or other unresolved issues, students may have little interest in learning. For example, we may identify the situation of an academic examination of a school, in which the cause of securing good marks in various subjects leads to mental and emotional readiness of students to do more hard labour in acquiring knowledge.

== Exercise ==
Every time practice occurs, learning continues. These include student recall, review and summary, and manual drill and physical applications. All of these serve to create learning habits. The instructor must repeat important items of subject matter at reasonable intervals, and provide opportunities for students to practice while making sure that this process is directed toward a goal. But in some or many cases, there is no need for regular practice if the skill is acquired once. For instance if we have learnt cycling once, we will not forget the knowledge or skill even if we aren't exercising it for a long time.

== Effect ==
However, every learning experience should contain elements that leave the student with some good feelings. A student's chance of success is definitely increased if the learning experience is a pleasant one.

== Primacy ==
Primacy, The instructor must present subject matter in a logical order, step by step, making sure the students have already learned the preceding step. If the task is learned in isolation, if it is not initially applied to the overall performance, or if it must be relearned, the process can be confusing and time consuming. Preparing and following a lesson plan facilitates delivery of the subject matter correctly the very first time.

== Recency ==
The principle of recency states that things most recently learned are best remembered. Conversely, the further a student is removed time-wise from a new fact or understanding, the more difficult it is to remember.

== Intensity ==
The more intense the material taught, the more likely it will be retained. A sharp, clear, vivid, dramatic, or exciting learning experience teaches more than a routine or boring experience. The principle of intensity implies that a student will learn more from the real thing than from a substitute. Examples, analogies, and personal experiences also make learning come to life. Instructors should make full use of the senses (hearing, sight, touch, taste, smell, balance, rhythm, depth perception, and others).

== Freedom ==
Since learning is an active process, students must have freedom: freedom of choice, freedom of action, freedom to bear the results of action—these are the three great freedoms that constitute personal responsibility. If no freedom is granted, students may have little interest in learning.

== Requirements ==
The law of requirement states that "we must have something to obtain or do something." It can be an ability, skill, instrument or anything that may help us to learn or gain something. A starting point or root is needed; for example, if you want to draw a person, you need to have the materials with which to draw, and you must know how to draw a point, a line, a figure and so on until you reach your goal, which is to draw a person.

== Laws of learning applied to learning games ==
The principles of learning have been presented as an explanation for why learning games (the use of games to introduce material, improve understanding, or increase retention) can show such incredible results. This impacts flow and motivation and increases the positive feelings toward the activity, which links back to the principles of exercise, readiness, and effect. Games use immersion and engagement as ways to create riveting experiences for players, which is part of the principle of intensity. Finally, part of the primary appeal of games is that they are fun. Although fun is hard to define, it is clear that it involves feelings such as engagement, satisfaction, pleasure, and enjoyment which are part of the principle of effect.

== See also ==
- Learning theory (education) – Theory that describes how students receive, process, and retain knowledge during learning
  - Constructivism (philosophy of education) – Theory of knowledge
  - Radical behaviorism – Term pioneered by B.F. Skinner
- Instructional design – Process for design and development of learning resources
- Instructional theory – Theory that offers explicit guidance on how to better help people learn and develop
- Educator effectiveness
