= Concurrent overlap =

Memory processing overlap

In human memory research, concurrent overlap, or task appropriate processing, is a type of processing overlap between an activity engaged in before the prospective memory is to be remembered and a cue that directs attention towards the prospective memory. It is prospective memory specific and is distinct from sequential overlap, or transfer-appropriate processing, which occurs in both retrospective and prospective memory and is defined as the overlap in processing the to-be-remembered memory between planning (or study in retrospective memory) and test times.
