= Metacognition =

Self-awareness about thinking, higher-order thinking skills

Metacognitive processes deal with information about other cognitive processes.

Metacognition is an awareness of one's thought processes and an understanding of the patterns behind them. In simple terms it is "to think about one's own thinking". The term comes from the root word meta, meaning "beyond", or "on top of". Metacognition can take many forms, such as reflecting on one's ways of thinking, and knowing when and how oneself and others use particular strategies for problem-solving. There are generally two components of metacognition: (1) cognitive conceptions and (2) a cognitive regulation system. Research has shown that both components of metacognition play key roles in metaconceptual knowledge and learning. Metamemory, defined as knowing about memory and mnemonic strategies, is an important aspect of metacognition.

Writings on metacognition date back at least as far as two works by the Greek philosopher Aristotle (384–322 BC): On the Soul and the Parva Naturalia.

== Definition ==
This higher-level cognition was given the label metacognition by American developmental psychologist John H. Flavell (1979).

The term metacognition literally means 'above cognition' and denotes cognition about cognition, or, more informally, thinking about thinking. Flavell defined metacognition as knowledge about cognition and control of cognition. For example, a person is engaging in metacognition if they notice that they are having more trouble learning A than B, or if it strikes them that they should double-check C before accepting it as fact. J. H. Flavell (1976, p. 232). Andreas Demetriou's theory (one of the neo-Piagetian theories of cognitive development) used the term hyper-cognition to refer to self-monitoring, self-representation, and self-regulation processes, which are regarded as integral components of the human mind. Moreover, with his colleagues, he showed that these processes participate in general intelligence, together with processing efficiency and reasoning, which have traditionally been considered to compose fluid intelligence.

Metacognition also involves thinking about one's own thinking processes, such as study skills, memory capabilities, and the ability to monitor learning. This concept needs to be explicitly taught alongside content instruction. A pithy statement from M.D. Gall et al. is often cited in this respect: "Learning how to learn cannot be left to students. It must be taught."

Metacognition is a general term encompassing the study of memory monitoring and self-regulation, meta-reasoning, consciousness/awareness, and autonoetic consciousness/self-awareness. In practice, these capacities are used to regulate one's own cognition, to maximize one's potential to think, learn, and to evaluate proper ethical/moral rules. It can also reduce response time in a given situation due to heightened awareness and potentially reduce the time to complete problems or tasks.

In the context of student metacognition, D. N. Perkins and Gavriel Salomon observe that metacognition concerns students' ability to monitor their progress. During this process, students ask questions like "What am I doing now?", "Is it getting me anywhere?", and "What else could I be doing instead?" Perkins and Salomon argue that such metacognitive practices help students to avoid unproductive approaches.

In the domain of experimental psychology, an influential distinction in metacognition (proposed by T. O. Nelson & L. Narens) is between Monitoring—making judgments about the strength of one's memories—and Control—using those judgments to guide behavior (in particular, to guide study choices). Dunlosky, Serra, and Baker (2007) covered this distinction in a review of metamemory research that focused on how findings from this domain can be applied to other areas of applied research.

In the domain of cognitive neuroscience, metacognitive monitoring and control have been viewed as a function of the prefrontal cortex, which receives (monitors) sensory signals from other cortical regions and implements control using feedback loops (see chapters by Schwartz & Bacon and Shimamura, in Dunlosky & Bjork, 2008).

Metacognition is studied in the domain of artificial intelligence and modelling. Therefore, it is the domain of interest of emergent systemics.

== Concepts and models ==
Metacognition has two interacting phenomena guided by a person's cognitive regulation:

1. Metacognitive knowledge (also called metacognitive awareness) is what individuals know about themselves and others, like beliefs about thinking and such, as cognitive processors.
2. Metacognitive experiences are those experiences that have something to do with the current, ongoing cognitive endeavor.

Metacognition refers to a level of thinking and metacognitive regulation, the regulation of cognition and subsequent learning experiences that help people enhance their learning through a set of activities. It involves active metacognitive control or attention over the process in learning situations. The skills that aid in regulation involve planning how to approach a learning task, monitoring comprehension, and evaluating progress towards task completion.

Metacognition includes at least three different types of metacognitive awareness when considering metacognitive knowledge:

1. Declarative knowledge: refers to knowledge about oneself as a learner and about what factors can influence one's performance. Declarative knowledge can also be referred to as "world knowledge".
2. Procedural knowledge: refers to knowledge about doing things. This type of knowledge is displayed as heuristics and strategies. A high degree of procedural knowledge can allow individuals to perform tasks more automatically. This is achieved through a large variety of strategies that can be accessed more efficiently.
3. Conditional knowledge: refers to knowing when and why to use declarative and procedural knowledge. It allows students to allocate their resources when using strategies. This, in turn, makes the strategies more effective.

These types of metacognitive knowledge also include:

- Content knowledge (declarative knowledge), which involves understanding of one's own capabilities, such as a student evaluating their own knowledge of a subject in a class. Notably, not all metacognition is accurate. Studies have shown that students often mistake a lack of effort for understanding when evaluating themselves and their overall knowledge of a concept. Also, greater confidence in having performed well is associated with less accurate metacognitive judgment of the performance.
- Task knowledge (procedural knowledge), which is how one perceives the difficulty of a task, including the content, length, and type of assignment. The study mentioned in Content knowledge also addresses a person's ability to evaluate the difficulty of a task relative to their overall performance on it. Again, the accuracy of this knowledge was skewed: students who thought their way was better/easier also seemed to perform worse on evaluations, while students who were rigorously and continually evaluated reported being less confident but still did better on initial evaluations.
- Strategic knowledge (conditional knowledge) is one's own capability for using strategies to learn information. Young children are not particularly good at this; it is not until students are in upper elementary school that they begin to develop an understanding of effective strategies.

In short, strategic knowledge involves knowing what (factual or declarative knowledge), knowing when and why (conditional or contextual knowledge), and knowing how (procedural or methodological knowledge).

Similar to metacognitive knowledge, metacognitive regulation, or "regulation of cognition," contains three skills that are essential.

1. Planning: refers to the appropriate selection of strategies and the correct allocation of resources that affect task performance.
2. Monitoring: refers to one's awareness of comprehension and task performance
3. Evaluating: refers to appraising the final product of a task and the efficiency with which the task was performed. This can include re-evaluating the strategies used.

Metacognitive control is an important skill in cognitive regulation; it involves focusing cognitive resources on relevant information. Similarly, maintaining motivation to see a task to completion is also a metacognitive skill that is closely associated with the attentional control. The ability to become aware of distracting stimuli – both internal and external – and sustain effort over time also involves metacognitive or executive functions. Swanson (1990) found that metacognitive knowledge can compensate for IQ and lack of prior knowledge when comparing fifth and sixth-grade students' problem-solving. Students with a better metacognition were reported to have used fewer strategies, but solved problems more effectively than students with poor metacognition, regardless of IQ or prior knowledge.

A lack of awareness of one's own knowledge, thoughts, feelings, and adaptive strategies leads to inefficient control over them. Hence, metacognition is a necessary life skill that needs nurturing to improve one's quality of life. Maladaptive use of metacognitive skills in response to stress can strengthen negative psychological states and social responses, potentially leading to psychosocial dysfunction. Examples of maladaptive metacognitive skills include worry based on inaccurate cognitive conceptions, rumination, and hypervigilance. Continuous cycles of negative cognitive conceptions and the associated emotional burden often lead to negative coping strategies such as avoidance and suppression. These can foster pervasive learned helplessness and impair the formation of executive functions, negatively affecting an individual's quality of life.

The theory of metacognition plays a critical role in successful learning, and both students and teachers need to demonstrate understanding of it. Students who underwent metacognitive training, including pretesting, self-evaluation, and creating study plans, performed better on exams. They are self-regulated learners who utilize the "right tool for the job" and modify learning strategies and skills based on their awareness of effectiveness. Individuals with a high level of metacognitive knowledge and skill identify blocks to learning as early as possible and change "tools" or strategies to ensure goal attainment. A broader repertoire of "tools" also assists in goal attainment. When "tools" are general, generic, and context-independent, they are more likely to be useful across different types of learning needs. In one study examining students who received text messages during college lectures, it was suggested that students with higher metacognitive self-regulation were less likely than others to have their learning affected by keeping their mobile phones switched on in class.

Finally, there is no distinction between domain-general and domain-specific metacognitive skills. This means that metacognitive skills are domain-general, and there are no specific skills for particular subject areas. The metacognitive skills that are used to review an essay are the same as those that are used to verify an answer to a math question.

However, whether metacognition is domain-general or domain-specific remains an active area of research. Neuroimaging and lesion studies have identified distinct neural substrates for perceptual versus memory metacognition, with perceptual judgments relying on anterior prefrontal cortex and memory monitoring engaging precuneus and medial parietal regions. A meta-analysis found no correlation between metacognition for perception and memory. However, domain-general confidence signals also exist in frontal and posterior midline regions, and large-scale behavioral studies report cross-domain correlations explaining approximately 15-20% of shared variance. This dissociation is particularly evident in aging, where older adults often retain metacognitive accuracy for memory while showing declines in perceptual metacognition, a pattern supported by distinct neural oscillatory mechanisms, including theta synchronization for perceptual metacognition and alpha desynchronization for memory metacognition.

=== Related concepts ===
A number of theorists have proposed a common mechanism behind theory of mind, the ability to model and understand the mental states of others, and metacognition, which involves a theory of one's own mind's function. Direct evidence for this link is limited.

Several researchers have related mindfulness to metacognition. Mindfulness includes at least two mental processes: a stream of mental events and a higher-level awareness of the flow of events. Mindfulness can be distinguished from some metacognition processes in that it is a conscious process.

=== Measuring metacognition ===
Research on metacognition has distinguished between metacognitive bias, metacognitive sensitivity, and metacognitive efficiency. Metacognitive bias refers to a general tendency toward overconfidence or underconfidence in judgments about one's performance. Metacognitive sensitivity describes how well confidence judgments distinguish between correct and incorrect responses. Metacognitive efficiency refers to a subject’s level of metacognitive sensitivity relative to task performance and allows researchers to assess how effectively individuals evaluate their own performance independent of overall accuracy.

Traditional measures of metacognition include confidence ratings following a decision or response, judgments of learning, and feeling-of-knowing judgments. However, these measures can be influenced by response biases and other factors unrelated to metacognitive ability. To address this issue, formal measures based on signal detection theory have been developed. These approaches use techniques such as receiver operating characteristic (ROC) analysis and metrics such as meta-d′ to estimate how effectively confidence judgments discriminate between correct and incorrect responses.

== Social metacognition ==
Although metacognition has thus far been discussed in relation to the self, recent research in the field has suggested that this view is overly restrictive. Instead, it is argued that metacognition research should also include beliefs about others' mental processes, the influence of culture on those beliefs, and on beliefs about ourselves. This "expansionist view" proposes that it is impossible to fully understand metacognition without considering the situational norms and cultural expectations that influence those same conceptions. This combination of social psychology and metacognition is referred to as social metacognition.

Social metacognition can include ideas and perceptions that relate to social cognition. Additionally, social metacognition can include judging the cognition of others, such as judging the perceptions and emotional states of others. This is in part because the process of judging others is similar to judging the self. However, individuals have less information about the people they are judging; therefore, judging others tends to be more inaccurate, an effect called the fundamental attribution error. Having similar cognitions can buffer against this inaccuracy and can be helpful for teams or organizations, as well as interpersonal relationships.

=== Social metacognition and the self-concept ===
An example of the interaction between social metacognition and self-concept can be found in examining implicit theories about the self. Implicit theories can cover a wide range of constructs about how the self operates, but two are especially relevant here: entity theory and incrementalist theory. Entity theory proposes that an individual's self-attributes and abilities are fixed and stable, while incrementalist theory proposes that these same constructs can be changed through effort and experience. Entity theorists are susceptible to learned helplessness because they may feel that circumstances are beyond their control (i.e., there's nothing that could have been done to make things better), and thus they may give up easily. Incremental theorists react differently when faced with failure: they desire to master challenges, and therefore adopt a mastery-oriented pattern. They immediately began to consider various ways that they could approach the task differently, and they increased their efforts. Cultural beliefs can also act on this. For example, a person who has accepted a cultural belief that memory loss is an unavoidable consequence of old age may avoid cognitively demanding tasks as they age, thus accelerating cognitive decline. Similarly, a woman who is aware of the stereotype that purports that women are not good at mathematics may perform worse on tests of mathematical ability or avoid mathematics altogether. These examples demonstrate that the metacognitive beliefs people hold about the self, which may be socially or culturally transmitted, can have important effects on persistence, performance, and motivation.

=== Attitudes as a function of social metacognition ===
The way individuals think about attitude greatly affects how they behave. Metacognitions about attitudes influence how individuals act, and especially how they interact with others.

Some metacognitive characteristics of attitudes include importance, certainty, and perceived knowledge, and they influence behavior in different ways. Attitude importance is the strongest predictor of behavior and can predict information-seeking behaviors in individuals. The importance of an attitude is also more likely to influence behavior than the certainty of the attitude. When considering a social behavior like voting, a person may place high importance on it but have low certainty. This means that they will likely vote, even if they are unsure who to vote for. Meanwhile, a person who is very certain about who they want to vote for may not actually vote if the election is of low importance to them. This also applies to interpersonal relationships. A person might have a lot of favorable knowledge about their family, but they may not maintain close relations with them if the family is of low importance.

Metacognitive characteristics of attitudes may be key to understanding how attitudes change. Research shows that the frequency of positive or negative thoughts is the biggest factor in attitude change. A person may believe that climate change is occurring but hold negative thoughts about it, such as "If I accept the responsibilities of climate change, I must change my lifestyle". These individuals would not likely change their behavior compared to someone who thinks positively about the same issue, such as "By using less electricity, I will be helping the planet".

Another way to increase the likelihood of behavior change is by influencing the source of the attitude. An individual's personal thoughts and ideas have a much greater impact on attitude than the ideas of others. Therefore, when people view lifestyle changes as coming from themselves, the effects are more powerful than if the changes were coming from a friend or family member. These thoughts can be re-framed in a way that emphasizes personal importance, such as "I want to stop smoking because it is important to me" rather than "quitting smoking is important to my family". More research needs to be conducted on culture differences and the importance of group ideology, which may alter these results.

=== Social metacognition and stereotypes ===
People have secondary cognitions about the appropriateness, justifiability, and social judgability of their own stereotypic beliefs. People know that it is typically unacceptable to make stereotypical judgments and make conscious efforts not to do so. Subtle social cues can influence these conscious efforts. For example, when given a false sense of confidence about their ability to judge others, people will return to relying on social stereotypes. Cultural backgrounds influence social metacognitive assumptions, including stereotypes. For example, cultures without the stereotype that memory declines with old age display no age differences in memory performance.

When it comes to making judgments about other people, implicit theories about the stability versus malleability of human characteristics also predict differences in social stereotyping. Holding an entity theory of traits increases the tendency for people to see similarities among group members and to use stereotyped judgments. For example, compared to those holding incremental beliefs, people who hold entity beliefs about traits make more stereotypical trait judgments of ethnic and occupational groups and form more extreme trait judgments of new groups. When an individual's assumptions about a group combine with their implicit theories, more stereotypical judgments may be formed. Stereotypes that one believes others hold about them are called metastereotypes.

== Animal metacognition ==
=== In nonhuman primates ===
==== Chimpanzees ====
Beran, Smith, and Perdue (2013) found that chimpanzees engaged in metacognitive monitoring during the information-seeking task. In their studies, three language-trained chimpanzees were asked to use a keyboard to name the food item they desired in order to receive the food item. The food in the container was either visible to them or they had to move toward the container to see its contents. Studies have shown that chimpanzees were more likely to check what was in the container first when the food was hidden. But when the food was visible to them, the chimpanzees were more likely to approach the keyboard directly and report the food's identity without looking back in the container. Their results suggested that chimpanzees know what they have seen and show effective information-seeking behavior when information is incomplete.

==== Rhesus macaques (Macaca mulatta) ====
Gin Morgan and colleagues (2014) investigated whether rhesus macaques (Macaca mulatta) can make both retrospective and prospective metacognitive judgments on the same memory task. Risk choices were introduced to assess the monkey's confidence about their memories. Two male rhesus monkeys were trained in a computerized token economy task, in which they could accumulate tokens to exchange for food rewards. The monkeys were presented with multiple images of common objects simultaneously, followed by a moving border that appeared on the screen to indicate the target. Immediately following the presentation, the target images and some distractors were shown in the test. During the training phase, monkeys received immediate feedback after they made responses. They can earn two tokens for correct choices but lose two tokens for incorrect ones.

In Experiment 1, the confidence rating was introduced after participants completed their responses to test retrospective metamemory judgments. After each response, a high-risk and a low-risk choice were provided to the monkeys. They could earn one token regardless of their accuracy by choosing the low-risk option. When they chose high-risk, they were rewarded with three tokens if their memory response was correct on that trial, but lost three tokens if they made an incorrect response. Morgan and colleagues (2014) found a significant positive correlation between memory accuracy and risk choice in two rhesus monkeys. That is, they were more likely to select the high-risk option if they answered correctly in the working memory task, but selected the low-risk option if they failed in the memory task.

Then, the group examined monkeys' prospective metacognitive monitoring skills in Experiment 2. This study employed the same design, except that two monkeys were asked to make low- or high-risk confidence judgments before making actual responses to measure their judgments about future events. Similarly, the monkeys were more likely to choose a high-risk confidence judgment before answering correctly in a working memory task and tended to choose the low-risk option before providing an incorrect response. These two studies indicated that rhesus monkeys can accurately monitor their performance and provided evidence of their metacognitive abilities.

=== In rats ===
In addition to nonhuman primates, other animals have also been shown to exhibit metacognition. Foote and Crystal (2007) provided the first evidence that laboratory rats have knowledge of what they know in a perceptual discrimination task. Rats were required to classify brief noises as short or long. Some noises with intermediate durations were difficult to discriminate as short or long. Rats were given the option to decline the test on some trials but were required to respond on other trials. If they chose to take the test and answered correctly, they would receive a high reward, but no reward if their classification of the noises was incorrect. But if the rats declined to take the test, they would be guaranteed a smaller reward. The results showed that rats were more likely to decline to take the test as the difficulty of noise discrimination increased, suggesting they knew they did not have the correct answers and declined to take the test to avoid receiving the reward. Another finding was that performance was better when rats chose to take the test than when they were forced to respond, indicating that some uncertain trials were declined to improve accuracy.

This response pattern might be attributed to actively monitoring their own mental states. Alternatively, external cues, such as associations with environmental cues, could be used to explain their behavior in the discrimination task. Rats might have learned the association between intermediate stimuli and the decline option over time. Longer response latencies or certain features inherent in stimuli can serve as discriminative cues for declining tests. Therefore, Templer, Lee, and Preston (2017) used an olfactory-based delayed match-to-sample (DMTS) memory task to assess whether rats could adaptively engage in metacognitive responding. Rats were exposed to a sample odor first and chose to either decline or take the four-choice memory test after a delay. The correct odor choices were associated with a high reward, and incorrect choices received no reward. The decline options were accompanied by a small reward.

In Experiment 2, some "no-sample" trials were added in the memory test in which no odor was provided before the test. They hypothesized that rats would decline more often when no sample odor was presented than when an odor was presented, if rats could internally assess the memory strength. Alternatively, if the decline option were motivated by external environmental cues, the rats would be less likely to decline the test because no available external cues were presented. The results showed that rats were more likely to decline the test in no-sample trials relative to normal sample trials, supporting the notion that rats can track their internal memory strength.

To rule out other possibilities, they also manipulated memory strength by presenting the sampled odor twice and varying the retention interval between learning and testing. Templer and colleagues (2017) found rats were less likely to decline the test if they had been exposed to the sample twice, suggesting that their memory strength for these samples was increased. The longer-delayed sample test was more often declined than the short-delayed test because their memory was better after the short delay. Overall, their series of studies demonstrated that rats could distinguish between remembering and forgetting and rule out the possibilities that decline in use was modulated by the external cues, such as environmental cue associations.

=== In pigeons ===
Research on the metacognition of pigeons has shown limited success. Inman and Shettleworth (1999) employed the DMTS procedure to test pigeons' metacognition. Pigeons were presented with one of three sample shapes (a triangle, a square, or a star), and then they were required to peck the matched sample when three stimuli simultaneously appeared on the screen at the end of the retention interval. A safe key was also presented in some trials next to three sample stimuli, which allowed them to decline that trial. Pigeons received a high reward for pecking correct stimuli, a middle-level reward for pecking the safe key, and nothing if they pecked the wrong stimuli. Inman and Shettleworth's first experiment found that pigeons' accuracy was lower, and they were more likely to choose the safe key, as the retention interval between stimulus presentation and test increased. However, in Experiment 2, when pigeons were given the option to escape or take the test before the test phase, there was no relationship between choosing the safe key and longer retention intervals. Adams and Santi (2011) also employed the DMTS procedure in a perceptual discrimination task, in which pigeons were trained to discriminate between illumination durations. Pigeons did not choose the escape option more often as the retention interval increased during initial testing. After extended training, they learned to escape the difficult trials. However, these patterns might be attributed to pigeons learning an association between escape responses and longer retention delays.

In addition to the DMTS paradigm, Castro and Wasserman (2013) proved that pigeons can exhibit adaptive and efficient information-seeking behavior in the same-different discrimination task. Two arrays of items were presented simultaneously, in which the two sets of items were either identical or different from one another. Pigeons were required to distinguish between the two arrays of items in which the level of difficulty was varied. Pigeons were provided with an "Information" button and a "Go" button on some trials, so that they could increase the number of items in the arrays to make the discrimination easier, or they could be prompted to make responses by pecking the Go button. Castro and Wasserman found that the more difficult the task, the more often pigeons chose the information button to solve it. This behavioral pattern indicated that pigeons could assess the task's difficulty internally and actively seek information when necessary.

=== In dogs ===
Dogs have shown a certain level of metacognition, being sensitive to whether they have acquired information or not. Belger & Bräuer (2018) examined whether dogs could seek additional information when facing uncertain situations. The experimenter put the reward behind one of the two fences, so that dogs could see or could not see where the reward was hidden. After that, the dogs were encouraged to find the reward by walking around the fence. The dogs checked more frequently before selecting the fence when they did not see the baiting process, compared with when they saw where the reward was hidden. However, contrary to apes, dogs did not show more checking behaviors when the delay between baiting the reward and selecting the fence was longer. Their findings suggested that dogs exhibit some aspects of information-searching behavior but are less flexible than apes.

=== In dolphins ===
Smith et al. (1995) evaluated whether dolphins have the ability to engage in metacognitive monitoring in an auditory threshold paradigm. A bottlenosed dolphin was trained to discriminate between high-frequency tones and low-frequency tones. An escape option was available on some trials associated with a small reward. Their studies showed that dolphins could appropriately use the uncertain response when the trials were difficult to discriminate.

=== Debate ===
There is consensus that nonhuman primates, especially great apes and rhesus monkeys, exhibit metacognitive control and monitoring behaviors. But less convergent evidence was found in other animals such as rats and pigeons. Some researchers criticized these methods and posited that these performances might be accounted for by low-level conditioning mechanisms. Animals learned the association between reward and external stimuli through simple reinforcement models. However, many studies have demonstrated that the reinforcement model alone cannot explain animals' behavioral patterns. Animals have shown adaptive metacognitive behavior even in the absence of a concrete reward.

== Strategies ==
Metacognitive-like processes are especially ubiquitous when it comes to the discussion of self-regulated learning. Self-regulation requires metacognition by looking at ones awareness of ones learning and planning further learning methodology. Attentive metacognition is a salient feature of good self-regulated learners, but does not guarantee automatic application. Reinforcing collective discussion of metacognition is a salient feature of self-critical and self-regulating social groups. The activities of strategy selection and application include those concerned with an ongoing attempt to plan, check, monitor, select, revise, evaluate, etc.

Metacognition is 'stable' in that learners' initial decisions derive from the pertinent facts about their cognition through years of learning experience. Simultaneously, it is also 'situated' in the sense that it depends on learners' familiarity with the task, motivation, emotion, and so forth. Individuals need to regulate their thoughts about the strategy they are using and adjust it based on the situation to which the strategy is being applied. At a professional level, this has led to emphasis on the development of reflective practice, particularly in the education and health-care professions.

Recently, the notion has been applied to the study of second language learners in the field of TESOL and applied linguistics in general (e.g., Wenden, 1987; Zhang, 2001, 2010). This new development has been much related to Flavell (1979), where the notion of metacognition is elaborated within a tripartite theoretical framework. Learner metacognition is defined and investigated by examining their person knowledge, task knowledge and strategy knowledge.

Wenden (1991) has proposed and used this framework and Zhang (2001) has adopted this approach and investigated second language learners' metacognition or metacognitive knowledge. In addition to exploring the relationships between learner metacognition and performance, researchers are also interested in the effects of metacognitively-oriented strategic instruction on reading comprehension (e.g., Garner, 1994, in first language contexts, and Chamot, 2005; Zhang, 2010). The efforts are aimed at developing learner autonomy, interdependence and self-regulation.

Metacognition helps people to perform many cognitive tasks more effectively. Strategies for promoting metacognition include self-questioning (e.g. "What do I already know about this topic? How have I solved problems like this before?"), thinking aloud while performing a task, and making graphic representations (e.g. concept maps, flow charts, semantic webs) of one's thoughts and knowledge. Carr, 2002, argues that the physical act of writing plays a large part in the development of metacognitive skills.

Strategy Evaluation matrices (SEM) can help to improve the knowledge of cognition component of metacognition. The SEM works by identifying the declarative (Column 1), procedural (Column 2) and conditional (Column 3 and 4) knowledge about specific strategies. The SEM can help individuals identify the strength and weaknesses about certain strategies as well as introduce them to new strategies that they can add to their repertoire.

A regulation checklist (RC) is a useful strategy for improving the regulation of cognition aspect of one's metacognition. RCs help individuals to implement a sequence of thoughts that allow them to go over their own metacognition. King (1991) found that fifth-grade students who used a regulation checklist outperformed control students when looking at a variety of questions including written problem solving, asking strategic questions, and elaborating information.

Examples of strategies that can be taught to students are word analysis skills, active reading strategies, listening skills, organizational skills and creating mnemonic devices.

Walker and Walker have developed a model of metacognition in school learning termed Steering Cognition, which describes the capacity of the mind to exert conscious control over its reasoning and processing strategies in relation to the external learning task. Studies have shown that pupils with an ability to exert metacognitive regulation over their attentional and reasoning strategies used when engaged in maths, and then shift those strategies when engaged in science or then English literature learning, associate with higher academic outcomes at secondary school.

== Metastrategic knowledge ==
"Metastrategic knowledge" (MSK) is a sub-component of metacognition that is defined as general knowledge about higher order thinking strategies. MSK had been defined as "general knowledge about the cognitive procedures that are being manipulated". The knowledge involved in MSK consists of "making generalizations and drawing rules regarding a thinking strategy" and of "naming" the thinking strategy.

The important conscious act of a metastrategic strategy is the "conscious" awareness that one is performing a form of higher order thinking. MSK is an awareness of the type of thinking strategies being used in specific instances and it consists of the following abilities: making generalizations and drawing rules regarding a thinking strategy, naming the thinking strategy, explaining when, why and how such a thinking strategy should be used, when it should not be used, what are the disadvantages of not using appropriate strategies, and what task characteristics call for the use of the strategy.

MSK deals with the broader picture of the conceptual problem. It creates rules to describe and understand the physical world around the people who utilize these processes called higher-order thinking. This is the capability of the individual to take apart complex problems in order to understand the components in problem. These are the building blocks to understanding the "big picture" (of the main problem) through reflection and problem solving.

== Action ==
Both social and cognitive dimensions of sporting expertise can be adequately explained from a metacognitive perspective according to recent research. The potential of metacognitive inferences and domain-general skills including psychological skills training are integral to the genesis of expert performance. Moreover, the contribution of both mental imagery (e.g., mental practice) and attentional strategies (e.g., routines) to our understanding of expertise and metacognition is noteworthy. The potential of metacognition to illuminate our understanding of action was first highlighted by Aidan Moran who discussed the role of meta-attention in 1996. A recent research initiative, a research seminar series called META funded by the BPS, is exploring the role of the related constructs of meta-motivation, meta-emotion, and thinking and action (metacognition).

== Mental illness ==
In the context of mental health, metacognition can be loosely defined as the process that "reinforces one's subjective sense of being a self and allows for becoming aware that some of one's thoughts and feelings are symptoms of an illness". The interest in metacognition emerged from a concern for an individual's ability to understand their own mental status compared to others as well as the ability to cope with the source of their distress. These insights into an individual's mental health status can have a profound effect on overall prognosis and recovery. Metacognition brings many unique insights into the normal daily functioning of a human being. It also demonstrates that a lack of these insights compromises 'normal' functioning. This leads to less healthy functioning. In the autism spectrum, it is speculated that there is a profound deficit in theory of mind. In people who identify as alcoholics, there is a belief that the need to control cognition is an independent predictor of alcohol use over anxiety. Alcohol may be used as a coping strategy for controlling unwanted thoughts and emotions formed by negative perceptions. This is sometimes referred to as self medication.

=== Implications ===
Adrian Wells' and Gerald Matthews' theory proposes that when faced with an undesired choice, an individual can operate in two distinct modes: "object" and "metacognitive". Object mode interprets perceived stimuli as truth, where metacognitive mode understands thoughts as cues that have to be weighted and evaluated. They are not as easily trusted. There are targeted interventions unique of each patient, that gives rise to the belief that assistance in increasing metacognition in people diagnosed with schizophrenia is possible through tailored psychotherapy. With a customized therapy in place, clients then have the potential to develop greater ability to engage in complex self-reflection. This can ultimately be pivotal in the patient's recovery process. In the obsessive–compulsive spectrum, cognitive formulations have greater attention to intrusive thoughts related to the disorder. "Cognitive self-consciousness" are the tendencies to focus attention on thought. Patients with OCD exemplify varying degrees of these "intrusive thoughts". Patients also with generalized anxiety disorder also show negative thought process in their cognition.

Cognitive-attentional syndrome (CAS) characterizes a metacognitive model of emotion disorder (CAS is consistent with the attention strategy of excessively focusing on the source of a threat). This ultimately develops through the client's own beliefs. Metacognitive therapy attempts to correct this change in the CAS. One of the techniques in this model is called attention training (ATT). It was designed to diminish the worry and anxiety by a sense of control and cognitive awareness. ATT also trains clients to detect threats and test how controllable reality appears to be.

Following the work of Asher Koriat, who regards confidence as central aspect of metacognition, metacognitive training for psychosis aims at decreasing overconfidence in patients with schizophrenia and raising awareness of cognitive biases. According to a meta-analysis, this type of intervention improves delusions and hallucinations.

== Works of art as metacognitive artifacts ==
The concept of metacognition has also been applied to reader-response criticism. Narrative works of art, including novels, movies and musical compositions, can be characterized as metacognitive artifacts which are designed by the artist to anticipate and regulate the beliefs and cognitive processes of the recipient, for instance, how and in which order events and their causes and identities are revealed to the reader of a detective story. As Menakhem Perry has pointed out, mere order has profound effects on the aesthetical meaning of a text. Narrative works of art contain a representation of their own ideal reception process. They are something of a tool with which the creators of the work wish to attain certain aesthetical and even moral effects.

== Mind wandering ==
There is an intimate, dynamic interplay between mind wandering and metacognition. Metacognition serves to correct the wandering mind, suppressing spontaneous thoughts and bringing attention back to more "worthwhile" tasks.

== Organizational metacognition ==
The concept of metacognition has also been applied to collective teams and organizations in general, termed organizational metacognition.

== See also ==
- Educational psychology – Branch of psychology concerned with the scientific study of human learning
- Educational technology – Use of technology in education to enhance learning and teaching
- Epistemology – Philosophical study of knowledge
- Goal orientation – Social-cognitive motivational disposition
- Introspection – Examining one's own thoughts and feelings
- Learning styles – Theories that aim to account for differences in individuals' learning
- Meta-emotion – Emotions, and thoughts, about emotion
- Metaknowledge – Knowledge about knowledge
- Metaphilosophy – Investigation of the nature of philosophy
- Münchhausen trilemma – Thought experiment used to demonstrate the impossibility of proving any truth
- Metatheory – Theory whose subject matter is itself a theory
- Mentalization – Ability to understand mental state that underlies behavior
- Mindstream – Buddhist concept of continuity of mind
- Mirror test – Animal self-awareness test
- Phenomenology (philosophy) – Philosophical method and schools of philosophy
- Phenomenology (psychology) – Utilisation of analytic tools from phenomenology to study the human psyche
- Psychological effects of Internet use
- Second-order cybernetics – Application of cybernetics to itself

== Sources ==
- Briñol, Pablo; Demarree, Kenneth, eds. (2012). Social Metacognition. doi:10.4324/9780203865989. ISBN 978-1-135-23410-2.
