= Mark A. McDaniel =

American psychologist

- Born: December 4, 1952 (age 73); West Lafayette, IN
- Known for: Studies of human memory, Educational Psychology
- Scientific career
- Fields: Psychology, Cognitive
- Institutions: Washington University in St. Louis

Mark A. McDaniel (born December 4, 1952) is an American psychology researcher in the area of human learning and memory. He is one of the most influential researchers in prospective memory, but also well known for other basic research in memory and learning, cognitive aging, as well as applying cognitive psychology to education. McDaniel has published over 100 peer-reviewed articles, book chapters, and edited books. His research in memory and cognition has received over two million dollars in grant support from NIH and NASA.

== Biography ==
Born in West Lafayette, IN and raised in Lexington, KY, McDaniel attained his undergraduate degree from Oberlin College, graduating with a Bachelor of Arts in Mathematics and Psychology in 1974. He completed his graduate study at University of Colorado, Boulder, receiving his MA in 1978 with a dissertation titled "Memory for the Meaning and Surface Structure of Sentences as a Function of Processing Difficulty" and his PhD in 1980 with a dissertation titled "Bottom-up and top-down acquisition of expertise on river crossing problems: A study of knowledge acquisition". After working at Bell Laboratory as a technical staff (1980–1981), he joined the faculty at University of Notre Dame (1981–1987), then Purdue University (1987–1994) and University of New Mexico (1994–2004; Chair of the Department of Psychology, 2002–2004). He has been a professor of psychology at Washington University in St. Louis since 2004. He has also been a visiting scholar at University of Basel (1990), University of Padova (1990), and University of Arizona (1993–1994). He has received numerous academic awards, published widely, and served as consulting and associated editor for ten scholarly journals. He is co-founder and co-director of The Center for Integrative Research on Cognition, Learning, and Education (CIRCLE).

== Elections, honors, and awards ==
McDaniel has been elected as a Fellow of multiple national and international organizations, and he has also received a number of honors and awards. Selected honors are listed below:

Year	Award
1996 – 1997	President of the Rocky Mountain Psychological Association
2003	Fellow of the American Psychological Association, Division 3
2007	Fellow of the Association for Psychological Science
2008	Fellow of the Society of Experimental Psychologists
2012 – 2013	President of the American Psychological Association, Division 3

== Prospective memory ==
Prospective memory is memory for performing intended actions in the future. For decades, researchers studied prospective memory outside of the laboratory by having participants phone an experimenter on a certain date or remember to mail a postcard to the experimenter. McDaniel, along with his colleague Gil Einstein, are credited with developing one of the earliest, and since then the most frequently used, laboratory measure of prospective memory. In addition to developing the standard laboratory measure of prospective memory, McDaniel has made several contributions to the understanding of the processes underlying successful prospective memory retrieval. His Multiprocess Framework contends that individuals can consciously maintain prospective memory intentions and monitor for retrieval cues, or they may rely on cue-driven spontaneous retrieval processes. The efficacy of monitoring and spontaneous retrieval processes is assumed to depend on the quality of encoding, the quality of the retrieval cue, and the overlap between encoding and retrieval conditions (termed cue focality). McDaniel has further distinguished the neural bases of these retrieval processes by using functional magnetic resonance imaging to illustrate that monitoring is supported by sustained anterior prefrontal cortex activation, whereas spontaneous retrieval is not. An important prediction of McDaniel's Multiprocess Framework is that aging impacts prefrontal-cortex-dependent monitoring processes, but not spontaneous retrieval processes that are assumed to be more automatic. The nature of age-related changes in prospective memory continues to be debated by the field, but research findings are consistent in showing that monitoring declines with aging and spontaneous retrieval appears to remain relatively intact in older adults. (see also Prospective memory)

== Cognition and education ==
McDaniel has also been an influential proponent of applying principles of cognitive psychology to enhance educational practices. Specifically, his work has focused on the benefits of testing, question generation, and rereading. Furthermore, he has published papers on the importance of differentiating between rule and exemplar learners for function and category learning. McDaniel has also attempted to bridge the gap between laboratory studies and the classroom by examining these cognitive phenomena in authentic classrooms ranging from middle school to college contexts. Additionally, McDaniel co-authored the book, Make it Stick, with Peter C. Brown and Henry L. Roediger III which synthesizes cognitive principles discussed above to help learners of all ages to improve their learning.
