= Steering cognition =

Model of a cognitive executive function in psychology

In psychology, steering cognition is a model of a cognitive executive function which contributes to how attention is regulated and corresponding responses coordinated.

== History ==
The term 'steering cognition' was coined by the researcher Simon P. Walker who discovered consistent, replicable patterns of attention and corresponding response through repeated cognitive tests between 2000 and 2015, in studies with over 15,000 individuals. Working with his colleague Jo Walker, he was able to show that these patterns correlated with other cognitive attributes such as mental wellbeing, social competency and academic performance. Together, Walker and Walker conjecture that steering cognition is a central mechanism by which people self-regulate their cognitive, emotional and social states.

== Theoretical model ==
Steering cognition describes how the brain biases attention toward specific stimuli whilst ignoring others, before coordinating responsive actions which cohere with our past patterns of self-representation. Steering cognition enables the use of limited cognitive resources to make sense of the world that someone expects to see.

== Empirical evidence ==
Walker developed a specific steering cognition test used with more than 11,000 candidates between the ages of eight and 60 between 2002 and 2015. Using principal component analysis, Walker was able to identify 7 latent largely independent 'heuristic substitution' factors which he labelled S, L, X, P, M, O, T. He labelled this data model 'the Human Ecology model of Cognitive Affective Social state' or CAS for short. In the most recent and largest ever study, involving 8,000 secondary pupils in the UK, exploratory factor analysis confirmed a largely orthogonal factor analysis structure in which Eigen values revealed the CAS model 7 latent factors explained 50% of the overall variance. For the sake of parsimony, a 7 factor solution has been regarded as acceptable. Studies have shown that steering cognition is distinct from the mind's engine or 'algorithmic processing' which is responsible for how we process complex calculations. The state of steering cognition at any time is influenced by 'priming' effects - cues in the surrounding environment such as sights, sounds and messages of which we may not be conscious. Studies have shown that environmental biasing of our steering cognition can contribute to non-conscious in-group behaviours, e.g. an increased likelihood of groupthink or emotional contagion. Studies have shown that, during adolescence, individuals develop more fixed patterns of steering. By adulthood, these patterns become recognisable as mental traits, behaviours and social attributes. There are some authors, including Meredith Belbin, who claim that people with more flexible steering cognition have advantages in jobs which require greater social or cognitive dexterity because of improved social relating and leadership skills. Steering cognition has been shown to depend on our ability to mental simulate or imagine ourselves performing tasks and functions. As such, Steering cognition requires the capacity to self-represent, associating memories of our past and possible future selves. Steering cognition has been shown to implicate our affective (emotional), social and abstract cognitions.

== Effects on learning, social and emotional development ==
The ability to regulate steering cognition has been shown to account for up to 15% of academic outcomes at secondary school not accounted for by IQ. Steering cognition can be improved through pupil feedback, coaching and more carefully structured and supportive environments. Poorly regulated steering cognition has been shown to correlate strongly with increased mental health and welfare risks during adolescence. A study in 2015 showed that pupils with certain fixed biases in their steering cognition were four times more likely to exhibit self-harm, be bullied or not cope with school pressures.

A large 2014 study showed that boarding school education resulted in better pupil ability to regulate steering cognition across social situations than day school education. This so-called 'tribe effect' is conjectured to lead to continued social advantages beyond school, such as access to future in-group benefits in work and wider society.

== Practical applications ==
The importance of steering cognition lies in its explanation of human behaviours which lead to either risks or advantages for individuals and groups. The ability to regulate one's steering cognition is unrelated to IQ or rational group behaviour, so measuring steering cognition offers an explanation of behaviours and events not currently detected by traditional metrics and models. The Sunday Times reported in October 2015 that a growing number of schools in the UK, including independent schools Monkton Combe School and Wellington College, were now using a technology, AS Tracking, developed by Mind.World to measure student steering cognition as an 'early warning system' for welfare and mental health risks. Thomas's London Day Schools are using a curriculum, Footprints, to train pupils as young as eight to improve their steering cognition as part of their social and emotional development. Wellington College has engaged in steering cognition research studies as part of the school's evidenced-based education programme. Harrow School, one of Britain's leading independent schools, is piloting AS Tracking as part of a proactive strategy to provide the best possible pastoral care for pupils. The school is measuring steering cognition to gather concrete measurements that can be used as supporting evidence when planning or dealing with individuals and also tracking changes over time as boys move up through the school. Educational campaigners Sir Anthony Seldon and Sir Peter Lampl have suggested steering cognition has application for understanding and improving social mobility.

== Research fields related to steering cognition ==
Executive function

Steering cognition is a model of social and cognitive executive function. It explains a functional governor mechanism by which the mind coordinates attention and executes responsive action.

Metacognition

Steering cognition is a model of metacognition. It describes the capacity of the mind to exert conscious control over its reasoning and processing strategies in relation to external data and internal state.

Self-regulation

Steering cognition is an explanatory mechanism of some phenomena of affective, cognitive and social self-regulation. It describes effortful control processes which exhibit depletion after strain.

Mental simulation circuitry

Steering cognition has been repeatedly shown to implicate the mind's mental simulation circuitry. As such, it is associated with functional neural circuits involved in prospective and retrospective memory, self-representation, associative processing and imagination.

Dual process theory

According to the steering cognition model, dual process System 1 functions as a serial cognitive steering processor for System 2, rather than the traditionally understood parallel system. In order to process epistemically varied environmental data, a steering cognition orientation system is required to align varied, incoming environmental data with existing neural algorithmic processes. The brain's associative simulation capacity, centered around the imagination, plays an integrator role to perform this function.

Cognitive biases

In the cognitive steering model, a conscious state emerges from effortful associative simulation, required to align novel data accurately with remote memory, via later algorithmic processes. By contrast, fast unconscious automaticity is constituted by unregulated simulatory biases, which induce errors in subsequent algorithmic processes. The phrase 'rubbish in, rubbish out' is used to explain errorful steering cognition processing: errors will always occur if the accuracy of initial retrieval and location of data is poorly self-regulated.

Social priming

Steering cognition provides an explanation of how the mind is non-consciously influenced by the environmental cues, or primes, around it. Steering cognition studies have produced data of attentional bias and blindness best explained by environmental priming.

== See also ==
- Cognitive bias
- Emotional self-regulation
- Simulation heuristic
