= Time-based prospective memory =

Time-based prospective memory is a type of prospective memory in which remembrance is triggered by a time-related cue that indicates that a given action needs to be performed. An example is remembering to watch a television program at 3 p.m. In contrast to time-based prospective memory, event-based prospective memory is triggered by an environmental cue that indicates that an action needs to be performed. An example is remembering to send a letter (the action) after seeing a mailbox (the cue). While event-based memory is dependent on the environment, time-based prospective memory is self-initiated; one must specifically monitor the passage of time.

== Neuroanatomy ==
=== Rostral prefrontal cortex ===
Until recently, not a lot has been known about the cognitive functions of the rostral prefrontal cortex, also known as Area 10 of the brain. In humans, this area of the brain is very large (25-30 cubic cm). The Rostral Prefrontal Cortex supports a cognitive system that reflects either stimulus-oriented (SO) or stimulus-independent (SI) attending. SI attending supports self-generated or self-maintained thought, which is important in prospective memory. This part of the brain has also been shown to play a crucial role in the maintenance and realization of delayed intentions. Delayed intentions triggered by event cues are well understood; time cues however have been less studied.

In a positron emission tomography (PET) study, participants were asked to make a prospective response in either an event-based or time-based task condition. Differences in activation of regions of the rostral prefrontal cortex were seen in the results according to whether the task was time- or event- based. Three rostral prefrontal regions were more active in the time-based condition: the right superior frontal gyrus, anterior medial frontal lobe and anterior cingulate gyrus. These results suggest that there are different processing demands made by event- or time- based prospective memory tasks.

=== Parietal lobe ===
Animation. Parietal lobe (red) of left cerebral hemisphere.

In terms of prospective memory, the parietal lobe plays an important role in processing and recognizing cues that trigger and keep attention focused on intended actions while performing other tasks. This part of the brain is activated most intensely when these cues are visual or spatial. The parietal lobe is located in the superior region of the brain above the occipital lobe and behind the frontal lobe.

For time-based prospective memory, the parietal lobe is important especially when an individual is required to remember numbers, more specifically, a certain time that will act a cue to perform an intended task. The activation of this area is studied using PET as well as magnetoencephalography (MEG). Damage to this area of the brain increases the difficulty of performing time-based tasks more significantly than it does event-based tasks. This is because time-based tasks place more demand on inhibitory control mechanisms than do event-based tasks.

== Factors affecting prospective memory ==
=== Age ===
Age is a significant factor that affects prospective memory. Smith et al. (2010) conducted a study comparing time-based prospective memory in children and young adults; they found an increase in preparatory attentional processing for adults –suggesting an improvement of time-based prospective memory from childhood to young adulthood. Consistent with the results of the prior study, Ceci and Bronfenbrenner (1985) found that in a time-based task with 10-year-olds and 14-year-olds, time monitoring was greater among older children.

Another study by Kvavilashvili et al. (2009) comparing time-based prospective memory among young adults (18- to 30-year-olds), young-old adults (60- to 75-year-olds) and old-old adults (79- to 90-year-olds), found that young adults performed the best on time-based tasks. A study further compared the difference between young-old adults and old-old adults in time-based prospective memory, finding that young-old adults outperformed old-old adults. The findings of the above studies suggest that there is ongoing improvement of time-based prospective memory from childhood into young adulthood; however, a decrease begins in later adulthood.

=== Substance use ===
Substance abuse refers to the harmful use of substances, including alcohol and illicit drugs. Multiple studies have shown that abuse of substances can damage our memory system. Current research has looked at the effect of substances on prospective memory; ability to remember to do something in the future. In particular it has been found that cannabis, ecstasy, methamphetamine and alcohol are substances that directly affect time-based prospective memory.

==== Cannabis ====
Marijuana is the world's most commonly abused illicit drug. The effects of cannabis are associated with deficits in memory, learning, decision-making, and speed of processing. Montgomery et al. (2012) conducted a study on twenty cannabis-only users and 20 non-illicit drug users to test the effect of cannabis on prospective memory. Cannabis users found it more difficult to perform an action at a certain time than nonusers. The results provide support for the cannabis-related deficits in prospective memory.

==== Ecstasy ====
Prospective memory impairments in recreational drug users have been documented in recent years. Hadjiefthyvoulou et al. (2011) compared performance of ecstasy users, cannabis users, and nonuser on both event and time-based prospective memory tasks. Ecstasy users performed significantly worse in comparison to both cannabis only and non-user groups on time-based tasks. Time-based prospective memory is sensitive to regular and even moderate use of ecstasy. More importantly, ecstasy users experience generalized difficulties with prospective memory, demonstrating that these deficits are likely to have important implications for daily functioning.

==== Methamphetamine ====
Methamphetamine more commonly known as crystal meth, is a highly addictive drug. A fair amount of research indicates that the use of methamphetamine is associated with neurocognitive impairment, more recently there has been a focus on whether these difficulties extend to memory for future intentions. Rendell et al. (2009) found that impairments in time-based prospective memory existed in both current and former users of methamphetamine.

==== Alcohol ====
Research has shown that heavy alcohol use clearly leads to deficits in memory. Less is known about the effects of alcohol on day-to-day memory function, specifically, prospective memory, remembering to do things at some future point in time. The results of a study conducted by Heffernan et al. (2010) suggest that binge drinking in the teenage years leads to impairments in everyday prospective memory. A study by Heffernan and O'Neill (2011) further investigated the effect has alcohol on time-based prospective memory and concluded that binge drinking was associated with significantly reduced performance on time-based tasks.

=== Disease and disorders ===
There has been an increase in interest of studying prospective memory deficiencies in individuals with disease or disorder; because daily life largely relies on previously planned intentions a lack thereof would cause major issues for an affected individual. It has been found that many diseases and disorders have negative impacts on prospective memory; the effects extend from mild cognitive impairment to dementia.

==== Parkinson's disease ====
A study by Costa et al. (2008) found that individuals with Parkinson's disease were significantly less accurate in time-based tasks than healthy participants; however, there was no difference between the groups in ability to retrieve the intention to perform the actions in the event-based condition. For example, a person with Parkinson's disease might forget to take their prescription at a certain time of the day, but are less likely to forget if they see the medicine bottle. A study by Katai et al. (2003) found results inconsistent with those of Costa and colleagues; individuals with Parkinson's disease were not significantly impaired on time-based tasks, however, these specific results were affected by the fact that 18 out of the 20 participants were receiving levodopa medication –which has been proven to increase performance on time-based tasks.

Research done by Costa et al. (2008) specifically focused on studying the effect of levodopa on the performance of individuals with Parkinson's disease on a time-based prospective memory task. Participants were evaluated in two conditions: after levodopa administration and without drug administration. The researchers found that participants were significantly more accurate in complying with the time-based task following levodopa medication as opposed to the individuals who did not take medication.

==== Alzheimer's disease ====
Carrying out an action depends on a variety of aspects, including how easily the intended action comes to mind. People may be able to remember what they intend to do, but will only be successful if the information is springs to mind at the appropriate time. People with Alzheimer's disease have great difficulty in remembering to do things, and doing them at the right moment. A study by Spíndola and Brucki (2011), found significant deficits for time-based tasks in patients with Alzheimer's compared with their healthy counterparts.

A failure to perform future intentions can have serious consequences. For example, failing to remember to turn off the burner after a 10-minute cooking time. However, there has been a number of studies, which indicate that individuals with Alzheimer's disease can learn a prospective memory task using spaced-retrieval practice; it is an effective means of helping cognitively impaired older adults maintain functional independence.

==== Schizophrenia ====
Impairment of memory is a major problem for people diagnosed with Schizophrenia. Studies have shown that participants with schizophrenia were significantly impaired on prospective memory tasks; both time-based and event-based.

Medication and a therapeutic technique known as cognitive behavioral therapy are equally important in treating schizophrenia. Prospective memory is important for treating schizophrenia because affected individuals have to remember to take their medication or attend a therapy appointment. Failure to do so can result in the re-emergence of schizophrenic symptoms such as hallucinations, disorganized speech, and paranoia.

=== Emotion ===
Research strongly suggests that emotional processes influence accuracy and the way in which humans carry out intended actions. It has been found that the ability to carry out time-based intended actions is negatively affected when individuals are in depressive emotional states. A study done by Kliegel and Jager (2006) found that performance on time-based tasks suffered when individuals were in a depressive state, as opposed to in an anxious state. The time-based prospective memory task was vulnerable to negative influence of depression, presumably because the time-based task required a high degree of self-initiated, effortful processing; and effortful processing is thought to be diminished in depression.

Further support comes from research done by Jeong and Cranney (2009) who found that depression is negatively associated with time-based prospective memory performance; people in a depressive emotional state were less likely to execute intended actions on time.

Kliegel et al. (2005) investigated the effects of sad mood on time-based prospective memory, and found results consistent with those of the above two studies. However, the study suggests that it would be of interest to extend these results to investigate effects of happy mood fluctuations, because happy mood states impair executive functions more reliably than sad mood.

=== Motivational incentive ===
It is obvious that, to a large extent, people remember what they want to remember. If a person considers a task to be insignificant, they will be less motivated to remember the intention; and ultimately pay less attention to available time-cues. Thus, forgetting of the memory for the intended action is more likely to occur.

In a study by Jeong and Cranney (2009), it was shown that motivation had a rather strong impact on performance in time-based prospective memory tasks. The study involved students who were required to send text messages at a specific time; participants given the incentive of extra course credit (motivation condition) outperformed their counterparts on the time-based task. The results display a positive effect of high motivation on time-based prospective memory.

Another study, done by Kliegel et al. (2008), supports the aforementioned findings. This study explored the effect of motivation in two age groups (three-year-olds and five-year-olds) when completing the same prospective memory task, with different motivational conditions. In the high motivation condition there was no difference for the two age groups, however, in the low-motivation condition, the two age groups differed significantly, with a decline in the performance of three-year-old children.

In order to enhance time-based prospective memory, people should avoid low motivational states.

=== Cognitive load ===
Prospective memory is performed in the context of another activity. Since memory is limited with the respect to the amount of information it can hold, and the number of operations it can perform, a higher cognitive load would deteriorate performance on prospective memory tasks.

A study by Khan et al. (2008) examined the influence of cognitive load (low vs. high) on time-based prospective memory. The findings implied that time-based prospective memory is severely affected when cognitive load is high. The study attributed the poor performance on time-based tasks as a result of dividing attentional resources into actively monitoring time, self-initiating the response at the appropriate time and the ongoing task. Humans have limited attentional capacity, and therefore high cognitive load affects monitoring of time and consequently time-based prospective memory performance negatively. Numerous aspects of daily life depend on time-based prospective memory, ranging from daily activities such as remembering what time to meet a friend, to more important tasks such as remembering what time to take medication.

== Methods of testing ==
Prospective memory as defined by Kvavilashvili et al. (1996) is remembering to do something at a particular moment in the future or the timely execution of a previously formed intention. Time-based prospective memory is when a specific time is the cue indicating that a given action needs to be performed (e.g. calling someone at 3pm). In contrast with time-based prospective memory there is also event-based prospective memory which requires less strain on the cognitive load.

=== Self-reports ===
- The Prospective and Retrospective Memory Questionnaire

Smith et al. developed The Prospective and Retrospective Memory Questionnaire to make a self-report that covered both retrospective and prospective items, unlike previous self-reports like the Cognitive Failures Questionnaire created by Broadbent et al. (1982) and also the Everyday Memory Questionnaire developed by Sunderland et al. (1988). Consists of 16 items, 8 asking prospective failures and the other 8 asking retrospective failures. The items on the questionnaire are also designed to contain an equal number concerned with either self-cued memory or environmentally cued memory, and with short-term versus long-term memory. The questionnaire provides a useful measure of everyday memory for use in clinical research and practice.

=== Simulated naturalistic environments ===
Crawford et al. (2006) constructed a virtual shopping precinct from photographs, sounds and video segments linked together. Their aim was to assess deficits in participants prospective remembering following chronic traumatic brain injuries, under conditions of high and low distractions. Participants are matched with a control group and their goal is complete a list of 10 errands with the help of a checklist. There are 3 targets that appear at certain times throughout their task that make up the prospective component. The group with traumatic brain injuries performed poorly compared to the control group, suggesting how extremely important certain brain areas are in time-based prospective memory.

=== Dual-task procedures ===
Participants had to perform a working memory task and were also required to perform a time-based prospective action. Control participants either did one or the other, but not both. In the time-based task participants had to make a key press after intervals of 10 and 20 minutes while they were performing another task. Einstein et al. (1996) found a direct comparison between time-based prospective memory and age/memory type that did not exist when testing event-based prospective memory.

=== Test-Wait-Test-Exit (TWTE) ===
Harris et al. (1982) proposed a time-based prospective memory model stating that people encode the future task and then wait for a period of time until a test of memory seems reasonable. If the time is not correct, people tend to wait until the critical exit period. If performance turns out to be successful, then it is dependent that you check on critical time periods. It is also assumed that this monitoring was an intentional process requiring an individual's full attention.

=== Value of items taken ===
Research performed by Bakker et al. (2002) examined the relationship between the value of an item borrowed from a patient for a prospective task and the number of cues required by a patient for requesting its return. 63 patients (27 men, 36 women) who underwent neuropsychological examinations in Cortical Function Laboratory of the Johns Hopkins Hospital between 1997 and 2000 were analyzed. Most of the patients were elderly and either had known or suspected dementia. The examiner asked the patients for a personal possession, which was then placed into a drawer in full view of the patient. They were then asked to request for their possession to be returned at the end of the testing period which was between 2–3 hours. At the end of the experiment the examiner would say, "O.K. We are done with testing. Let's find Dr. X." If the patient was able to remember to request for their item, she/he earned a score of zero because no additional cues were needed. If the patient was unable to remember to ask for their item back, an additional question asking "I wanted you to remember something at the end of the testing. Do you remember what that was?" If the patient could then remember, he/she was scored a 1 because of 1 additional cue. If the patient was still unable to ask for their item back, an additional question was added again increasing their score to 2. The highest score a patient could receive was 4, and that is when the experiment ended if the patient could not remember what to ask for after 3 additional cues. The relative value of the items taken from patients were determined by 15 Psychology faculty members from Johns Hopkins based on how much distress their owners would feel if the items were lost. A low rank value determines that the item is valuable and a high rank value indicates the item is less valuable. Results show that although sex and education do not affect the ability to remember the item taken, the age of the patient and value of the object are significant.

== Everyday time-based memory ==
Everyday functioning often depends on timely execution of intentions at specific times (e.g., paying bills, keeping appointments, making specific phone calls, taking medication).

=== Time management ===
Time management has developed in order for us to be able to distribute time and get our activities/work complete. Although it is not proven that there is a significant relationship between time-based prospective memory and time management, there is significant correlations that indicate that people who are more organized and manage their time well report better memory.

=== Technological advancement ===
Technological advancements such as smartphones and products from Apple Inc. allow organization of an individual's day to become a lot more efficient. A study done by Guger et al. explains how a severely memory impaired teenager MK is able to confidently go through her day with schedule and alarm systems provided from smartphones.

=== Contraception ===
Time-based prospective memory is involved in taking oral contraceptive pills daily. A study investigating the satisfaction with oral contraceptive pills and time-based prospective memory by Matter et al. (2008) showed that women who provided higher time-based prospective memory were more satisfied with the pill, as well as receiving less stress levels.
