= Task-appropriate processing =

Optimal learning strategies

In the domain of prospective memory, task-appropriate processing refers to the superiority of certain types of learning strategies over others in memory tasks. Task-appropriate processing appears to be facilitated by the unconscious detection of cues for the appropriate processing strategy. Task-appropriate processing is related to transfer-appropriate processing in that the task-appropriateness of learning strategies influences the effectiveness of recall after learning tasks.
