= Match-to-sample task =

Short-term memory for learned associations has been studied using the match-to-sample task (and the related delayed match-to-sample task, and non-match to sample task). The basic procedure begins by presenting a subject with a stimulus (often a light of a particular color, or a visual pattern) that they will be required to remember, known as the 'sample'. They are then required to identify from a subsequent set of stimuli one that 'matches' the sample, known as the comparison stimuli. While the correct comparison stimulus option often matches the sample identically, the task can require a symbolic match or a matching of similar features (e.g. similar in color or shape).

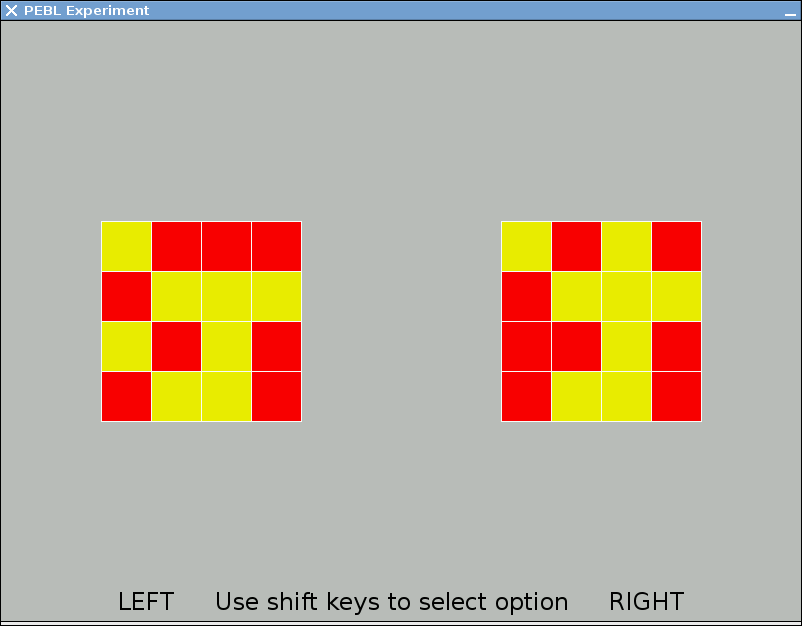
Screen shot of the PEBL computerized match-to-sample task. The participant originally saw one of the two patterns, and after a delay was asked to choose which of the two was originally shown.

== Historical background ==
Match-to-sample tasks were developed during the era of behaviorism, and were described by, among others, B.F. Skinner in its early form. A pigeon would be presented with a colored light stimulus sample. It would then proceed to peck the sample and then be presented with two comparison stimuli. One comparison stimulus matches the sample (either because it is an identical color, or because the animal has learned an association such as green means left) and the other does not match. If it chooses (pecks) the matching comparison, then it is rewarded.

A more complex version of the task has formed the basis for human-centered cognitive test batteries since the 1980s. This version of the task involves a 4X4 matrix pattern that is filled with yellow and red squares. Participants are allotted a specific amount of time to study the first pattern that appears on the screen. After the first pattern disappears, it is then replaced by a pair of matrices. One of these is the same as the previously viewed stimulus and one differs by one or more cells of the matrix. The participant then indicates which of the two was the presented stimulus. One trial of this tasks takes approximately 5–10 seconds.

== Strengths and weaknesses ==
The strengths of this procedure are that participants have a limited time to think, so if they are more aware/alert, they should make more correct responses. It has also been hypothesized to be impacted by alertness, but resilient to practice effects.

== Sleep deprivation ==
The match-to-sample task has been shown to be an effective tool to understand the impact of sleep deprivation on short-term memory. One research study compared performance on a traditional sequential test battery with that on a synthetic work task requiring subjects to work concurrently on several tasks, testing subjects every three hours during 64 hrs of sleep deprivation. Similarly, another study used an event-related functional magnetic resonance imaging of the neural networks underlying the encoding, maintenance, and retrieval phase in the task. This test was used to discover the reduction in pattern expressions with sleep deprivation for each subject and how it related to the change in performance on the delayed-match-to-sample task. It also expanded the prefrontal areas regarding working memory and revealed substantial individual differences in performance. The test also reproduced findings of other working memory studies which demonstrated interactions between PFC and other parts of the brain.

== Delayed match-to-sample tasks and working memory ==
The Delayed match-to-sample procedure is a slightly more complex variation of the task. In this case there is a time delay between the presentation of the sample and the comparison stimuli. By varying the length of the delay we can gain insight into how long the subject can retain information in their working memory. We can also use the delay to identify the extent to which modifying or adding new stimuli affects the performance of working memory in the subject. This is known as 'interference' and can come in two forms; retroactive (following the presentation of the sample) or proactive (prior to the presentation of the sample).
