= Prospective memory =

Form of memory that involves a planned future action or intention

Prospective memory is a form of memory that involves remembering to perform a planned action or recall a planned intention at some future point in time. Prospective memory tasks are common in daily life and range from the relatively simple to extreme life-or-death situations. Examples of simple tasks include remembering to put the toothpaste cap back on, remembering to reply to an email, or remembering to return a rented movie. Examples of highly important situations include a patient remembering to take medication or a pilot remembering to perform specific safety procedures during a flight.

In contrast to prospective memory, retrospective memory involves remembering people, events, or words that have been encountered in the past. Whereas retrospective memory requires only the recall of past events, prospective memory requires the exercise of retrospective memory at a time that has not yet occurred. Prospective memory is thus considered a form of "memory of the future".

Retrospective memory involves the memory of what we know, containing informational content; prospective memory focuses on when to act, rather than focusing on informational content. There is some evidence demonstrating the role of retrospective memory in the successful execution of prospective memory, but this role seems to be relatively small.

== Types ==
=== Event-based vs. time-based ===
There are two types of prospective memory: event-based and time-based prospective memory. Event-based prospective memory involves remembering to perform certain actions when specific circumstances occur. For example, driving past the local library cues the remembrance of the need to return an overdue book. Time-based prospective memory involves remembering to perform an action at a particular point in time. For example, seeing that it is 10:00 PM acts as a cue to watch a favorite television show.

Research performed by Sellen et al. (1997) compared event-based and time-based cues on prospective memory tasks. The experimenters gave participants a place (event-based cue) and a time (time-based cue) and were told to press a button each time those cues appeared during the study. It was found that performance on event-based tasks was better than performance on time-based tasks, even when participants took more time to think about their responses. The difference in task performance between the two types of prospective memory suggests that the intended action was better triggered by external cues of the event-based task than internal cues of the time-based task. External cues, as opposed to internal cues, act as a prompt for better performance, making it easier to complete event-based tasks.

=== Types of event-based prospective memory: Immediate-execute vs. delayed-execute ===
McDaniel et al. (2004) further distinguished event-based prospective memory into immediate-execute tasks and delayed-execute tasks. Immediate-execute tasks involve a response as soon as a particular cue is noticed, while delayed-execute tasks involve delays between the perception of the relevant cue and the performance of the intended action. Delayed-execute tasks more commonly occur in real life when circumstances of a situation prevent intermediate action once the cue has been perceived. Research was performed by McDaniel et al. (2004), in which participants completed tasks involving various delays and interruptions between cues and responses. It was demonstrated that correct performance suffered when there was a delay or interruption during a task. However, it was further shown that the use of reminders for participants eliminated the effects of the interruption task.

== History and theoretical perspectives ==
=== History ===
Prospective memory received wide attention when Ulric Neisser included a paper presented by John A. Meacham at the 1975 American Psychological Association meeting in Chicago in his 1982 edited volume, Memory Observed: Remembering in Natural Contexts. Previously, this paper and three other articles by Meacham had received little notice. Meacham defined prospective memory as information with implications for actions to be performed in the future, such as stopping at the store on the way home, and distinguished it from retrospective memory, concerned solely with recall of information from the past. Meacham was the first to introduce this distinction, along with the term prospective memory.

There is great interest about the possible mechanisms and resources that underlie the workings of prospective memory.

=== The preparatory attentional and memory (PAM) theory ===
The preparatory attentional and memory (PAM) theory proposes two types of processes involved in successful prospective memory performance. The first component of this theory involves a monitoring process that begins when a person constructs an intention that is then maintained until it is performed. This monitoring component involves a capacity-consuming process, similar to those used when maintaining attention, because there is a need for the intention to be stored and maintained in memory. The second component involves the use of elements of retrospective memory processes. These elements are used to differentiate between the wanted prospective memory intention and unwanted thoughts, in an attempt to keep focus on the goal and not the other options surrounding it. Retrospective memory is also used to remember specifically what intention is supposed to be performed in the future, and the monitoring process is needed to be able to remember to perform this action at the correct condition or time.

According to this theory, prospective memory should be enhanced when complete attention is given to the desired task than when attention is divided among multiple tasks. Research conducted by McDaniel et al. (1998) attempted to prove that prospective memory performance is better on focused tasks as opposed to those where attention is split. Subjects completed a prospective memory task in either a condition where full attention was given or a condition where attention was divided on other tasks. The results were consistent with the PAM theory, showing that participants' prospective memory performance was better with full attention.

However, there is a lot of scepticism that the rather complex mechanisms of the PAM theory are required for all, sometimes mundane, prospective memory tasks. In research by Reese and Cherry (2002), participants formed an intention to act in the future, but were interrupted prior to acting on their intention when the cue was present. When participants were asked their thoughts at the moment of interruption, only 2% reported that they were thinking of the original intention. This demonstrated evidence against the PAM theory, that there is constant maintenance from the time of constructing the intention to acting upon it at the right circumstance.

=== Reflexive-associative theory ===
Further research conducted by Einstein and McDaniel in 1990, found that subjects during prospective memory tasks reported that their intention often "popped" into mind, instead of being constantly monitored and consciously maintained. Along similar lines, a theory was proposed in 2000, called the reflexive-associative theory, which states that when people create an intention for a prospective memory task, they make an association between the target cue and the intended action. Later when the target cue occurs, the automatic associative-memory system triggers the retrieval of the intended action and brings it back into conscious awareness. Therefore, as long as the target cue occurs, the association previously made will initiate the retrieval of the intended action, regardless of whether the intention is in consciousness.

=== Multi-process model ===
Another theory that has been used to explain the mechanisms of prospective memory is the multi-process model proposed by McDaniel and Einstein (2005). This theory states that prospective memory retrieval does not always need an active monitoring process but can occur spontaneously (i.e., the occurrence of a cue can cause the intention to be retrieved, even when no preparatory attentional processes are engaged). Therefore, multiple processes can be used for successful prospective memory. Further, it was believed that it would be maladaptive to rely solely on active monitoring because it requires a lot of attentional resources. This may potentially interfere with other forms of processing that are required for different tasks during the retention interval.

Prospective memory cues will lead to spontaneous retrieval of an intention when at least one of four conditions is met: the cue and target action are highly associated with each other, the cue is salient, the other processes performed during the period between cue and action of the prospective memory task direct attention to relevant cue features (e.g., task appropriate processing), or the intended action is simple. Further research has found that although many aspects of prospective memory tasks are automatic, they do involve a small amount of processing. An experiment conducted by Einstein et al. (2005) found that some participants performed slower on a filler task when performing a prospective memory task at the same time. Even though some of the participants did not engage in active monitoring, they showed nearly the same rate of success on the task, demonstrating the use of multiple processes for prospective memory performance.

== Neuroanatomy ==
=== Frontal lobe ===
View of the frontal lobe (red) in the left cerebral hemisphere

As prospective memory involves remembering and fulfilling an intention, it requires episodic memory, declarative memory, and retrospective memory, followed by supervisory executive functions. All of these are controlled by the frontal lobe which is situated at the front of the cerebral hemisphere.

Studies using positron emission tomography (PET) trace a slight increase in blood flow to the frontal lobe in participants completing prospective memory tasks involving remembering a planned action, while performing other tasks. During these procedures, sites of brain activation include the prefrontal cortex, specifically the right dorsolateral, ventrolateral, and medial regions, as well as the median frontal lobe. The prefrontal cortex is responsible for holding the intention in consciousness and suppressing other internal thoughts. The median frontal lobe keeps attention focused on the planned action instead of the other tasks.

The prefrontal cortex is involved mainly in event-based as opposed to time-based prospective memory. Cheng et al. (2008) had participants with lesions in the prefrontal cortex perform event-based and time-based prospective memory tasks. They found that performance was impaired in the event-based tasks, which use event cues to trigger intentions, but not in the time-based tasks which use time cues to trigger intentions.

Other lesion studies have also shown the use of the frontal lobe in remembering and focusing on intentions. Burgess et al. (2000) studied patients with lesions to areas in the frontal lobe such as Brodmann's area 10, finding that these patients failed to follow instructions and switch attention during prospective memory tasks.

=== Parietal lobe ===
View of the parietal lobe (red) in the left cerebral hemisphere

The parietal lobe is typically involved in processing sensory information and is situated in the superior region of the brain.

For prospective memory, the parietal lobe is important for recognizing cues that trigger an intended action, especially when the cues are visual or spatial. The parietal lobe is also responsible for maintaining attention on the intended action and inhibiting other activities during performance. Studies using PET have shown that the parietal lobe is activated when participants engage in prospective memory tasks involving visual information such as remembering a series of numbers. Activation of the parietal lobe is also evident in studies using magnetoencephalography (MEG) which traces electric activity of the brain.

Harrington et al. (1998) found that neural areas ranging from the inferior parietal cortex to the frontal gyri are involved in temporal monitoring during time-based prospective memory tasks. Patients with damage to these areas of the brain had difficulty judging duration and frequency of auditory tones that were presented. Keeping track of information over time is important for prospective memory, remembering intentions to perform in the future.

=== Limbic system ===
Much of the limbic system, which contains primitive brain structures relating to emotion and motivation, are involved in memory.

==== Hippocampus ====
View of the hippocampus (red) in the left and right cerebral hemispheres

The hippocampus is found in the medial temporal lobe and plays an extensive role in memory retrieval. For prospective memory, the hippocampus is responsible for searching for the intended action among other memories. Studies using PET show activation in the hippocampus during event-based and time-based prospective memory tasks.

Adda et al. (2008) assessed patients with episodic memory impairment due to epilepsy associated with mesial temporal sclerosis. Patients with this disorder have damage in the medial temporal lobe and hippocampus. Their performance on both event-based and time-based prospective memory tasks was significantly impaired. Their prospective memory performance was also worse than that of the control group after immediate, 30-minute, and seven-day delays, but was especially noticeable after the long delays because the patients could not maintain information for long periods of time. Patients also suffered in their speed of processing, disregarding distractions, and episodic memory.

The same impairment in prospective memory is also seen in patients with lesions to the hippocampus. Damage to the left hippocampus has shown to have a worse effect on prospective memory than damage to the right hippocampus. While the hippocampus as a whole may be involved in prospective memory, the left side plays more of a dominant role. This shows the complexity of the brain and more research is needed to further understand the role of each section.

==== Parahippocampal region ====
View of the parahippocampal gyrus (red) in the left cerebral hemisphere

The parahippocampal gyrus surrounds the hippocampus. Sensory information passes from cortical areas, through the parahippocampal gyrus to the hippocampus. The parahippocampal gyrus is activated during prospective memory tasks as shown by Kondo et al. (2010) who used diffusion tensor magnetic resonance imaging to trace the amount of water flow throughout the brain. This region is believed to play a role in recognizing cues that trigger the performance of intended actions.

Studies using PET have come to the same conclusions regarding the use of the parahippocampal gyrus for prospective memory. The parahippocampal gyrus is activated in paired-associate prospective memory tasks, in which participants must learn a pair of words and be able to remember one half of the word pair in later trials. It is suspected that the parahippocampal gyrus is additionally involved in monitoring the novelty of presented stimuli. If not monitored properly, new stimuli can be distracting during attempts to remember intentions for the future.

==== Thalamus ====
View of the thalamus (red) in the left and right cerebral hemispheres

The thalamus is also located near the hippocampus. It relays sensory information among cortical areas of the brain, mediating the responses of cells and attentional demands. During successful prospective memory tasks, PET shows that the thalamus is activated when intention cues are presented and acted upon. No activity is shown in conditions where participants are expecting the cues to appear. Therefore, it is likely that the thalamus helps to maintain intentions and execute intentions only at the appropriate time.

==== Anterior and posterior cingulate ====
View of the cingulate (red) in the left cerebral hemisphere

The cingulate is another structure associated with the hippocampus. Its role in memory function is relaying information between the hippocampus and cortical areas. The anterior and posterior cingulate are involved in planning and creating intentions, which are initial stages in prospective memory. Lesions in the left anterior cingulate lead to failing to recall intentions, especially after a delay, which is needed for later stages of prospective memory.

== Testing methods ==
Methods that test prospective memory require the distinction between retrospective memory, which is remembering information, and prospective memory, which is remembering information for the future. Prospective memory requires retrospective memory because one must remember the information itself in order to act in the future. For example, remembering to buy groceries after work (prospective memory) requires the ability to remember what type of groceries are needed (retrospective memory). While prospective memory and retrospective memory are connected, they are distinguishable. This makes it possible to separate these two processes during tests.

=== Self-report ===
==== Early self-report measures ====
Many early measures of memory did not account for the distinction between prospective and retrospective memory. For example, the Cognitive Failures Questionnaire created by Broadbent et al. (1982) consists of 25 questions with only two relating to prospective memory. The Everyday Memory Questionnaire created by Sunderland et al. (1984) contains 18 questions with only three relating to prospective memory.

==== Prospective and Retrospective Memory Questionnaire ====
The Prospective and Retrospective Memory Questionnaire (PRMQ) was developed by Smith et al. (2000) to measure self-reports of prospective and retrospective memory in patients with Alzheimer's disease. It is a questionnaire consisting of 16 items; in which participants rank how often memory failure occurs using a 5-point scale (Very Often, Quite Often, Sometimes, Rarely, and Never). The PRMQ equally assesses three variables: prospective and retrospective memory, short-term memory and long-term memory, and self-cued and environmentally-cued memory.

Since the PRMQ relies on self-report, it is limited by how participants interpret the questions, how participants perceive the strength of their own memory, and the willingness of participants to be truthful.

The PRMQ has been proven to be a reliable and accurate method of testing memory. It has been evaluated against 10 other competing models and used for a range of different demographics including gender, education, economic status, age and country of origin.

Many studies have used versions of the PRMQ since it was created. For example, the study by Crawford et al. (2003) used a PRMQ to test memory of a sample of the general adult population ranging in age from 17 to 94. Many questions are used to test all possible combinations of the different memory types assessed by the PRMQ. For example, questions such as "Do you decide to do something in a few minutes' time and then forget to do it?" assessed prospective memory, short-term memory, and self-cued memory. Questions such as "Do you repeat the same story to the same person on different occasions?" assessed retrospective memory, long-term memory, and environmentally-cued memory.

=== Prospective memory tasks ===
Prospective memory tasks can be used in a variety of ways to assess prospective memory. Firstly, results from these tasks can directly assess prospective memory. Furthermore, these tasks can be performed while experimenters use PET, magnetic resonance imaging (MRI), or MEG to monitor brain activation. Finally, these tasks can be followed by questionnaires about prospective memory. Combining different assessments can confirm or deny experimental findings, making sure that conclusions about prospective memory are accurate. All tasks can assess individual stages of prospective memory such as the formation or execution of an intention, or access prospective memory as a whole by looking at overall performance.

==== Event-based prospective memory tasks ====
In event-based prospective memory tasks, participants are asked to remember to perform a task when cued by the appropriate information. There are numerous possible types of event-based tasks. For example, Raskin (2009) asked participants to sign their name when given a red pen, while Adda et al. (2008) asked participants to remember to request for a personal item to be returned at the end of the experiment.

==== Time-based prospective memory tasks ====
In time-based prospective memory tasks, participants are asked to remember to perform a task at a certain point in time. There are also numerous possible types of time-based tasks. For example, Cheng et al. (2008) asked participants to check a clock every five minutes during a written test, while Adda et al. (2008) asked participants to remind the experimenter to pay a bill on time.

==== Standardized tests ====
Standardized tests have been created to uniformly test prospective memory and can incorporate different event-based and time-based tasks at the same time. Experimenters can test prospective memory by having people perform tasks in order, perform tasks in order but with interruptions, and multitask.

A typical standardized test may include the following five steps:

1. Participants are given instructions about an ongoing task and are allowed to practice.
2. Participants are given instructions for another task involving prospective memory.
3. Participants perform other activities during a delay between the formed intention and the presentation of the target cue.
4. Participants are reintroduced to the first ongoing task without being reminded of the prospective memory task.
5. The target cue is presented during the ongoing task, while the participants' memory is assessed by how many times they remember to perform the intended action from the prospective memory task.

Standardized tests such as the Cambridge Prospective Memory Test (CAMPROMT) or the Memory for Intentions Screening Test (MIST) are written tests in which participants complete event-based and time-based tasks while performing distractor tasks such as a word search. Participants are given verbal and written instructions and are allowed to use strategies such as note-taking in order to aid memory. Their performance is scored on a scale of 1 to 18, with 18 representing highest prospective memory performance.

=== Technological assessments ===
Technological assessments were created in order to more appropriately evaluate prospective memory by combining real life intentions with experimental control.

Virtual reality
In virtual reality, participants perform prospective memory tasks in a virtual world on a computer. Experimenters can create event-based tasks such as remembering to label boxes as fragile before moving or time-based tasks such as allowing a removal man to enter the house in five minutes. All tasks involve daily and other real life actions that rely on some aspects of prospective memory.
Prospective Remembering Video Procedure
In the Prospective Remembering Video Procedure (PRVP), participants are informed that they will receive tasks to complete while watching a video on a television screen. They are given a response sheet in order to record details of the tasks when the appropriate cues appear in the video. A distractor task is given at a certain point in order to test for prospective memory. Titov and Knight (2001) used a PRVP with a video consisting of a pedestrian walking through a shopping district and required participants to make decisions on whether to buy certain items as if they were the pedestrian. Shopping requires many prospective memory intentions such as remembering what items are needed and what items can be purchased another day.

== Factors affecting prospective memory ==
=== Age ===
There is an increasing amount of research on the effect of age on prospective memory where typical studies compare groups of people from different ages. A study by Smith et al. (2010) comparing event-based prospective memory in schoolchildren (7–10 years old) and young adults found that adults had better memory performance. Another study by Kvavilashvili et al. (2009) comparing time-based prospective memory among young adults (18- to 30-year-olds), young-old adults (60- to 75-year-olds) and old-old adults (76- to 90-year-olds) showed that young adults had better performance. Event-based prospective memory was further compared between young-old and old-old adults and findings were that young-old adults performed better than old-old adults. These studies suggested that there is continual improvement of prospective memory from childhood into young adulthood but that a decline begins in later adulthood.

=== Genetics ===
A study comparing prospective memory of non-psychotic first-degree relatives of patients with schizophrenia and control participants showed that the relatives performed significantly worse on time-based and event-based prospective memory tasks. Since schizophrenia has a heritable component, this suggested that genetics may play a role in affecting prospective memory.

=== Substance use ===
Smoking
Research shows mixed findings on the effect of smoking on prospective memory, but more evidence is in favour of smoking diminishing prospective memory performance. Self-reported measures such as the Prospective and Retrospective Memory Questionnaire (PRMQ) have reported no difference between smokers and non-smokers; however, results from prospective memory tasks have suggested otherwise. Tasks are more objective as they eliminate subjective biases which can occur on the PRMQ. A study by Heffernan et al. (2010) suggested that persistent smoking is associated with prospective memory decrements and the impact of nicotine on long-term prospective memory may be dose dependent. Greater amounts of smoking lead to worse prospective memory performance.
Alcohol
Excessive drinkers self-reported more deficiencies in both short-term and long-term prospective memory on questions in the PRMQ. Chronic heavy alcohol users showed impaired performance on tasks including learning word lists, short- and long-term logical memory, general working memory, and abstract reasoning. Research has also accessed the effects of binge drinking on everyday prospective memory in adolescents. Binge drinkers and non-binge drinkers participated in two prospective memory sub-scales of the PRMQ. In addition to the questionnaires, the Prospective Remembering Video Procedure (PRVP) was used to test for an objective measure of prospective memory. It was shown that increasing the amount of alcohol consumed per week was correlated with poorer prospective memory performance on the PRVP, illustrating a damaging effect of excessive drinking upon everyday prospective memory for adolescents.
Cannabis
Cannabis is a commonly used recreational drug derived from the plant Cannabis sativa. The drug targets the central nervous system and is associated with cognitive impairments such as deficits in decision-making, learning, and speed of processing. The most consistently reported deficit among users is related to memory performance. A study by Bartholomew et al. (2010) was conducted using the PRMQ and a video-based prospective memory task to test cannabis users and non-users. Cannabis users performed significantly worse on both the PRMQ and the video-based prospective memory task, suggesting that cannabis negatively affects prospective memory.
Ecstasy
Prospective memory performance is sensitive to regular and even moderate ecstasy use. Ecstasy users experience generalized difficulties with prospective memory
Methamphetamine
This highly abused drug known commonly as "crystal meth" and chronic use is known to cause cognitive impairment. The same researchers studying the effects of ecstasy use on prospective memory have found parallel effects of methamphetamine. Impairments in prospective memory are still recognizable in former users who have been drug-free for an average of six years.

=== Diseases and disorders ===
Many diseases and disorders negatively affect prospective memory, as well as source memory, item recognition, and temporal order memory. The effects range from mild cognitive impairments to more detrimental impairments such as early onset dementia.

Sickle cell disease
Sickle cell disease (SCD) is an autosomal recessive genetic blood disorder which leads to alterations in the shape of red blood cells. Not only can SCD impact the immune system, but it can lead to complications with memory. Children with SCD have shown impairments in event-based prospective memory. They may struggle with aspects of daily life that require prospective memory, such as forgetting to do homework even with a schoolbag nearby. More importantly, it is more difficult to manage the disease as they can forget about when to take medication or go to a doctor appointment. These effects can also persist into adulthood.
Parkinson's disease
Patients with early Parkinson's disease suffer a large enough amount of prospective memory impairment to be affected in everyday life. These patients show impairment in the use of internal attentional strategies which are required for intention retrieval. Parkinson's disease leads to poorer performance on time-based but not event-based prospective memory tasks. For example, patients may forget to take medication at certain times of the day, but forgetting is less likely if they see the medicine bottle.
Schizophrenia
Schizophrenia has been shown to result in generalized prospective memory difficulties and is also associated with impairments in retrospective memory and executive functioning. Some studies have shown that retrospective memory impairment is insufficient to produce the prospective memory impairment observed in schizophrenia patients. Therefore, schizophrenia leads to primary deficits in prospective memory, resulting in poor performance on both event-based and time-based prospective memory tasks. Managing schizophrenia includes the use of medication and therapy techniques such as cognitive behavioral therapy. Prospective memory is extremely important for these management techniques because forgetting medication or a therapy appointment can lead to the re-immergence of schizophrenic symptoms such as hallucinations, disorganized speech, and paranoia.
Multiple sclerosis
Multiple sclerosis is an inflammatory disorder that results in demyelination throughout the central nervous system. The relationship between the location of demyelination and cognitive impairment has not been consistently identified. Retrospective memory has been studied heavily and is known to be affected negatively by multiple sclerosis. However, a study by Rendell et al. (2006) showed that prospective memory failure is not entirely due to the failure of retrospective memory, and that multiple sclerosis can lead to generalized prospective memory difficulties.

=== Pregnancy ===
The effect of pregnancy on prospective memory is still under current study. Rendell et al. (2008) tested the prospective memory of 20 pregnant women in the laboratory. There were no significant differences observed between pregnant and non-pregnant women for event-based prospective memory tasks, but there were clear hindrances in performance for pregnant women in time-based prospective memory tasks such as a job deadline. Pregnant women are more likely to remember to perform an intention after the cue has already passed. Further, women tested a few months after giving birth were found to forget intentions entirely. Both these findings may be related to stress encountered during pregnancy or child rearing and lack of sleep.

=== Emotional target cues ===
Emotional target cues have been shown to eliminate age differences in prospective memory. For older participants, emotional prospective memory cues were better remembered than neutral cues. Whether the cues are positive or negative, strong emotional attachment makes the cue more self-relevant and easier to remember. Altgassen et al. speculated that the amygdala and hippocampus may play a role in this emotionally enhanced memory effect.

=== Motivational incentives ===
In a study by Kliegel et al. (2008), it was shown that motivational state affected performance in two age groups (three-year-olds and five-year-olds) completing the same prospective memory task. There was no difference for the two age groups when motivation was high but performance of the three years old was reduced when motivation was low. If a person considers a task to be unimportant or is affected by fatigue, they will not be motivated to remember the intention. Less attention will be given to relevant cues and the memory is more likely to be forgotten. Therefore, prospective memory can be enhanced by avoiding low motivational states.

== Everyday prospective memory ==
Various studies have reported that 50-80% of all everyday memories are, at least in part, related to prospective memory. Prospective memory is crucial for normal functioning since people form future intentions and remember to carry out past intentions on a daily basis. Numerous aspects of daily life require prospective memory, ranging from ordinary activities such as remembering where to meet a friend, to more important tasks such as remembering what time to take medication.

=== Time management ===
There is a complicated relationship between prospective memory and time management skills which include making lists, scheduling activities, and avoiding interruptions. Studies have not identified distinct cause and effect relationships between prospective memory and time management, but many consistent correlations have been observed. For example, people who reported better prospective memory according to the Prospective and Retrospective Memory Questionnaire (PRMQ) also indicated a higher likelihood of setting goals and priorities and being more organized. There may be a cyclical effect between prospective memory and time management: better memory may lead to better organization, and better organization may further lead to better memory.

=== Aviation ===
Aviation controllers are often occupied with multiple tasks at the same time, and hazardous effects can occur when prospective memory fails. In the 1991 Los Angeles airport runway collision, a tower controller in an airport forgot a step in a simple procedure and that led to two planes crashing into each other, killing a number of passengers and crew. An analysis of over 1300 fatal aviation accidents from 1950 to 2009 showed that the majority were due to pilot error: 50% attributed to pilot error, 6% due to non-pilot human error, 22% to mechanical failure, 12% to bad weather, 9% to sabotage, and 1% to other causes.

=== Nursing ===
The nursing environment is full of event-based and time-based prospective memory tasks. Simple tasks such as remembering to order a drug or calling patient's family and remembering when to switch shifts are just some examples of a nurse's reliance on prospective memory. It is surprising that not much research has been done concerning the importance of prospective memory in nurses since they face many life-threatening tasks.

=== Contraception ===
Prospective memory is required to remember when to take oral contraceptive pills. A study performed by Matter and Meier (2008) showed that women who self-reported higher prospective memory ability were more satisfied with oral contraceptive use and experienced lower stress levels. Having better memory makes it is easier for these women to remind themselves to take their contraceptives at the required time of the day.

=== Smartphones ===
With advancements in technology, Smartphones can serve as prospective memory aids. Electronic calendars are of great use in time-based prospective memory tasks and recently they have been shown to also cue event-based tasks. The iPhone, as well as phones using the Android operating system, can track the user's location using the phone's Global Positioning System (GPS) and send reminders based on the current location. For example, when a parent is near their children's school, the phone can send a reminder for them to pick up their children after school.

=== Education ===
Prospective memory has been implicated in the steering cognition model of how children coordinate their attention and response to learning tasks in school. Walker and Walker showed that pupils able to adjust their prospective memory most accurately for different curriculum learning tasks in maths, science and English were more effective learners than pupils whose prospective memory was fixed or inflexible.

=== Prospective person memory ===
Attempts to find wanted or missing individuals through public alert systems sometimes make use of a type of event based prospective memory called prospective person memory. In prospective person memory, a picture of a wanted or missing person is presented to the public with instructions to report any sightings of the individual to authorities. Field experiments show that prospective person memory is often quite poor.

== See also ==
- Planning (cognitive)
- Prospection
