= Personal-event memory =

Type of human memory

A personal-event memory is an individual's memory of an event from a certain moment of time. Its defining characteristics are that it is for a specific event; includes vivid multi-sensory elements (sights, sounds, smells, body positions, etc.); is usually recalled in detail; and is usually believed by the individual to be an accurate representation of the event.

== Relation to other types of memory ==
Episodic memory and personal-event memories both are recollections of an event in one's life. A personal-event memory is a more specific type of episodic memory in that there is more detail and sensory qualities to a personal-event memory. Flashbulb Memories are memories for emotionally and personally significant events that are vivid and long lasting.

Both flashbulb memory and personal-event memory contain highly vivid details and sensory qualities for a specific moment in time. They both also have a belief in accuracy of the event remembered. When it comes to flashbulb memories, the most aspect that solidifies the formation is the personal attachment and context to the news or event, and the subjective elements rather than the event. For example, 9/11 is a common flashbulb memory due to the fact that it had subjective environmental, personal, and historical context to each individual old enough to remember the event. This study conducted research that found a steady decrease in the accuracy and number of details remembered from a flashbulb memory after several months following the event. Although this study found a decrease in recalled accuracy and number of from flashbulb memories, there is a similar study that explains that these memories are more resistant to fading than memories of other personal events at the time that the flashbulb memory was retained. This contradictory data indicates how information about these types of memories are ripe with debate and require more research.

Common examples of flashbulb memories are typically derived from negative and traumatizing events. However, a study was conducted that focused on the formation of positive flashbulb memories for personal events and aimed to compare and contrast negative and positive events. This study found that receiving an invitation to join a prestigious university-wide social organization (the studied positive event) did, in fact, form a flashbulb memory. Additionally, the ratings of confidence, belief in accuracy, and knowledge of setting were unexpectedly well above average memory formation, and these positive flashbulb memories were rated above the negative flashbulb memories. Another example of contradictory data is that this study indicated that the positive event memories were more stable and consistent over time.

== Neurological components ==
Studies have shown that activity in the medial temporal lobe (MTL) structures: perirhinal cortex, parahippocampal cortex and the hippocampus are vital to the recollection of personal-event memories along with other memories. the medial temporal lobe structures, parietal and frontal lobes of the brain, all contribute to forming and retrieving memories. The MTL structures are the primary components for creating long-term memories via words, spatial information, and recognition.

The amygdala also has been linked to personal-event memory storage and retrieval. Laboratory studies have demonstrated more activity in the amygdala and hippocampus for recollection of emotional memories. The emotional component of these memories seems to play an important role in their ease of retrieval.

Other studies demonstrate that Atrophy of the hippocampus due to aging in humans has been shown to decrease recollection of personal events.

== 9/11 study ==
A study examined the memory of a group of Canadian students for the events of September 11, 2001 that took place in the United States. Pezdek hypothesized that whereas event memory would be better than autobiographical memory for a group that was personally involved with the event (i.e. people in New York where the attacks occurred), the reverse would be true for a group that was less involved, such as the Canadian sample. They found that memory for event information was less consistent than memory for autobiographical information. They also found that subjects recalled more information about the personal circumstances and feelings surrounding the event than they did about the actual event. Furthermore, they found that the personal-event memory was significantly more accurate and more consistent in the participants who had experienced high arousal on hearing the news than in those who had experiences relatively little arousal. This better recall of the events of 9/11 for those who had experienced greater arousal supports Pezdek's hypotheses that personal-event memory improves with higher levels of experienced emotion. Finally, they found that event memory is positively correlated with level of emotional arousal and shows significant decline with time.

Another 9/11 study assessed the consistency of personal recollections of 9/10, 9/11, and 9/12 to collect more information on personal-event and flashbulb memories. The reported data suggested that 9/10 presented as a normal day, not affected by the traumatic event of 9/11, while 9/11 and 9/12 both had nearly 100% recollection (who, what, where) questionnaire scores compared to 9/10, whose scores were in the 70% range. 9/12 had the same recollection scores as 9/11 due to the fallout of the trauma being as impactful as the event itself. For example, related events that occurred in response to the attack, such as disrupted routines and schedules, police and military presence, etc.

== Event clusters ==
The study indicates that memorable personal events, regardless of age or importance, are often embedded in event clusters and that events organized by these clusters, like episodes in a story, are often causally related, temporally proximate, and similar in content.It can also be argued that the clusters are created when people plan, execute, and evaluate meaningful action sequences and that or narration serves to maintain or strengthen associations between clustered events.

== Reminiscence bump ==
Researchers have found that there seems to be a "reminiscence bump" where adults recall more memories from their adolescence and early adulthood years (ages 10-30). It is one of the most observed and researched phenomena in the memory research field. This "bump" states that memories of first-time or novel events during this specific time period are more easily recalled later in life compared to memories formed before or after the reminiscence bump. In other words, memories of a first time personal experience stand out better in the mind than memories of repetition or routine.

There are multiple hypotheses regarding the high occurrence of memory recall during adolescence and early adulthood: self-image hypothesis, cognitive hypothesis, self-narrative, and cultural life script hypothesis. The self-image hypothesis suggests that memory is heightened for events that happen while a young person is forming a self-image or identity. The cognitive hypothesis proposes that memory encoding is better during the rapid and distinct changes that occur during adolescence and early adulthood, like getting your driver's license or having your first kiss. The self-narrative hypotheses is similar to the self-image hypothesis, but it states that self-identity is conceptualized as a narrative about "the self". The final explanation, cultural life script hypothesis, hypothesizes that transitional life events occur more frequently during this time period, compared to others. Thus, people recall the memories more easily because big life changes, like college or marriage, happen during this time.
