= Destination memory =

Memory of to whom one has told information

Destination memory refers to a function of social cognition, describing the ability to remember to whom information has been communicated. This includes the more full reconstruction of social context through which a particular event has transpired. The medial temporal lobe is critical for successful destination memory because it is the region of the brain that controls our episodic memory, which includes destination memory. The neurological processes responsible for destination memory are impaired by normal aging and are significantly affected by Alzheimer's disease. In addition to being an interesting neurological process, destination memory error can cause awkward social interactions and social embarrassment.

The discovery that older adults not only remembered fewer words, but also tended to repeat the same words more frequently prompted the first studies of destination memory. This experiment began the investigation to what we now call destination memory. Gopie & MacLeod are responsible for coining the term "destination memory", and for initiating the beginning of many research experiments to further our understanding of memory error.

Destination memory plays a critical role in our episodic memory. It is considered an autobiographical memory because the information is recollected and remembered regarding oneself as a participant in a specific situation. Because humans are social creatures, our ability to communicate efficiently and effectively is important; therefore, remembering to whom we have told information is an important skill for successful social interactions.

== Neurological aspect ==
The medial temporal lobe is critical for successful destination memory. fMRI scans have demonstrated that the medial temporal lobe is involved with recollection-based memory, which includes destination memory. Mugijura et al. conducted an experiment in which subjects were asked to memorize a short fact when it appeared on a computer screen and then tell it to either a man or a woman. Later the participants were asked to recall which fact they told to which person and how confident (either high or low) they were in their answer. The subjects participated in both a practice round and second round in which they were monitored by a fMRI. Due to the activity displayed on the fMRI scans in the medial temporal lobe of the brain, they concluded that this region is critical for remembering to whom you have told information.

== Aging ==
Older adults have disproportionately impaired destination memory when compared to younger adults, which is due to the process of normal aging. Gopie, Craik, and Hasher coined the term destination amnesia to refer to this deterioration in destination memory. It is unclear as to what is specifically responsible for destination amnesia during aging; however, it is speculated that it is due to the general decline in memory. One's theory of mind ability is a significant predictor of destination memory ability in aging adults, as they both are positively correlated and depend upon executive functioning. Little research has been conducted to understand why destination memory deteriorates or what could slow the demise; however, older adults demonstrate improved destination memory performance when relaying information to an emotional face rather than a neutral face. Emotion improves destination memory performance for older adults as they continue to age, with negative emotions providing a greater impact. More research must be conducted to better understand ways to improve this memory error in order to prevent deterioration from aging.

== Alzheimer's disease ==
Alzheimer's disease is a progressive condition in which brain cells degenerate and die, leading to a steady destruction of one's memory and important mental functions. Because Alzheimer's disease has been shown to significantly affect episodic memory, researchers sought to understand how Alzheimer's disease affects destination memory, since it plays a critical role in our episodic memory. El Haj, Gandolphe, Allain, Fasotti, and Antoine found that those with Alzheimer's demonstrated poor performance in destination memory due to their inability to suppress appropriate versus inappropriate information during the memory retrieval process of their experiment. In addition to studying episodic memory, El Haj, Gély-Nargeot and Raffard sought to investigate the relationship between destination memory in Alzheimer patients and theory of mind because both processes are cognitive abilities that support effective communication and are linked to episodic memory function. They found that Alzheimer patients demonstrated a decline in destination memory as well as 2nd order cognitive theory of mind (Mary thinks that John thinks that...), but not for 1st order cognitive theory of mind (John thinks that...). Just as destination memory ability declines with normal aging, it is also negatively affected by Alzheimer's disease.

== Social consequences ==
Destination memory is critical for social interactions. Remembering to whom one has told information is expected and necessary for successful social interactions. Destination memory error can lead to social embarrassment when repeating stories to someone who has already heard them. While the fleeting emotion of social embarrassment may not be viewed as a serious mistake; destination memory can pose more serious issues in society. Including times when a supervisor delegates a specific task to an employee or when a professor forgets to whom they have given a specific responsibility. Errors like these can result in a diffusion of responsibility or an inability to accomplish necessary daily activities. Additionally, destination memory error can result in problematic situations for liars, as the inability to remember to whom they have told a story could result in getting caught in telling incongruent stories. Destination memory is necessary for successful communication.
