= Reminiscence =

Act of recollecting past experiences or events

Reminiscence is the act of recollecting past experiences or events. An example of the typical use of reminiscence is when people share their personal stories with others or allows other people to live vicariously through stories of family, friends, and acquaintances while gaining an authentic meaningful relationship with the people. An example of reminiscence may be grandparents remembering past events with friends or their grandchildren, sharing their individual experience of what the past was like.

== Psychological usage ==
=== Reminiscence therapy ===
Reminiscence can be defined as the act or process of recalling past experiences, events, or memories. Anyone can reminiscence about the past or a certain event, but reminiscence is often used in the older population, particularly the elderly population with forms of dementia as a therapeutic tool. This type of reminiscence is called reminiscence therapy. Reminiscence therapy is a non-pharmacological intervention that improves self-esteem and provides older patients with a sense of fulfillment and comfort as they look back at their lives. Although reminiscing involves recalling past events, it encourages older patients to communicate and interact with a listener in the present. Reminiscence sessions may be formal, informal, one-on-one, or in a group setting (Anon). Reminiscence therapy typically uses aids of tangible prompts such as photographs, household and other familiar items from the past, music and archive sound recordings (NCBI).

Dr. Robert Butler (1927–2010) is the accredited psychiatrist who first thought that reminiscing could be therapeutic. Butler, a psychiatrist with a specialty in geriatric medicine, first spoke of the idea of reminiscence and life review when he published an original article "The Life Review: An Interpretation of Reminiscence in the Aged" (Achenbaum, 2018).

Elderly patients with certain forms of dementia may not be able to remember what they had for lunch the previous day, but they will most likely remember their wedding day or they day their child was born. Reminiscence therapy uses this ability to recall events in the long term even when the patient's short-term memory may be declining.

Reminiscence therapy has been shown to have many benefits for aging adults, the most significant being the alleviation of symptoms of depression, though improvements to general well-being, ego-integrity, sense of purpose in life, cognitive performance, social integration, and death preparation have been noted as well. Numerous causes have been posited, from the value of finding meaning and coherence in one's life, the resolution of old conflicts, and the reinforcement of a sense of continuity.

In the later stages of dementia reminiscence therapy may become more difficult, but improvements to mood and happiness have been observed in controlled trials.

In psychology, and more specifically cognitive psychology, the word reminiscence is used in a different way than the common conversational use. The study of reminiscence has a long history, which is shortly described in Eysenck and Frith (1977, chapter 1):

Reminiscence is a technical term, coined by Ballard in 1913, denoting improvement in the performance of a partially learned act that occurs while the subject is resting, that is, not performing the act in question. (Eysenck and Frith, 1977, page 3).

The reality of reminiscence was first experimentally demonstrated by Oehrn (1896). In experiments on reminiscence the same task is always administered twice or more. One is mainly interested in the effect of the rest periods between the tasks. Learning might not be apparent within a task but it may be across tasks.

Reminiscing also contributes towards consolidation of memory, acting as a form of review. By returning to the memory and recalling it, reminiscence functions as spaced practice (see Spacing effect). Moreover, reminiscence with someone else can recalibrate one's memory by adjusting how one perceived the given experience, much like being tested.

A 2018 Cochrane review found probable benefits for cognition, mood and communication depending on setting in dementia patients but inconsistencies in interventions made drawing further conclusions impractical.

=== Reminiscence bump ===
People have a stronger recollection of memories from their late teens and young adult years. In cognitive psychological this is called the reminiscence bump.

The reminiscence bump is a phenomenon that naturally occurs when elderly people can remember the most about their lives when they were between the ages of 10 and 30 years old. Even for patients with dementia, the years during the reminiscence bump remain intact (until their illness has become very advanced) and can be easily recalled with some simple triggers like pictures or songs. (Psychology Today, 2018).

== See also ==
- Autobiographical memory
- Episodic memory
- Reminiscence bump
- Anamnesis (philosophy)
