= David Rubin (psychologist) =

American psychologist and academic

David C. Rubin
- Occupation: Professor at Duke University
- Years active: 1968–present
- Known for: Reminiscence Bump

David C. Rubin is an American cognitive scientist, Professor of Psychology at Duke University. He is known for his work on the reminiscence bump as well as other topics related to autobiographical memory.

He is most recognized for his research and publications regarding memory, specifically, the reminiscence bump and long-term memory. Through extensive education and academic background his career and research started to flourish in the 1970s. Rubin remains active in the field of memory today.

== Academic life ==
=== Academia ===
Rubin attended Carnegie-Mellon University for his undergraduate studies in Physics and Psychology. He received his Bachelor of Science for these two subjects and graduated in 1968. He then attended Massachusetts Institute of Technology from 1968 to 1969 as a Special Student of Psychology before being accepted into graduate school at Harvard University in 1970. It was at Harvard that Rubin obtained his PhD in Psychology by 1974.

=== Career and honors ===
In 1968, Rubin worked as an Aerospace Engineer for NASA Electronics Research Center in Massachusetts. It was here that he pursued research and development in optics. From 1974 to 1978 he was an assistant professor of psychology at Lawrence University located in Appleton, Wisconsin. He then moved to Durham, North Carolina to continue as an assistant professor of psychology until 1981 when he became an associate professor of psychology. He remains dedicated to Duke University as he became a Professor of Psychology, Professor of Experimental Psychology, and a Professor of Neuroscience in 1987. Rubin has been awarded for his work on memory throughout the years. Some of his most notable honors are: Became a Named Chair in psychology in 2008, Annual Distinguished Scholar Lecture Series in 2009, Honorary Doctorate at University of Aarhus in 2012, and in 2012, Rubin was elected a Fellow of the Society of Experimental Psychologists.

=== Current research ===
Rubin currently studies in the field of autobiographical memory at Duke University. Autobiographical memory is the remembrance of events from one's own life or, as we more commonly know it as our memory. Rubin and his fellow team of researchers exam the autobiographical memory of various populations. They exam participants by the use functional magnetic resonance imaging (fMRI), psychophysiological methods, as well as behavioral methods.

=== Selected publications ===
Rubin has done extensive psychological research primarily on memory. He has written and published many articles, listed below are some of these publications:

- D.C. Rubin.1995. Memory in oral traditions: The cognitive psychology of epic, ballads, and counting-out rhymes. New York; Oxford University Press.
- 1996. Remembering our past: Studies in autobiographical memory. Cambridge: Cambridge University Press.
- 2005. Cognitive Methods and their Application to Clinical Research. Washington, D.C.: American Psychological Association Press.
- Rubin, D.C. & Berntsen, D., & Bohni, M.K..2008.A memory-based model of posttraumatic stress disorder: Evaluating basic assumptions underlying the PTSD diagnosis. Psychological Review 985-1011 .
- D.C. Rubin, Boals, A., & Berntsen, D..2008.Memory in Posttraumatic Stress Disorder: Properties of voluntary and involuntary, traumatic and non-traumatic autobiographical memories in people with and without PTSD symptoms. Journal of Experimental Psychology: General 591–614.
- Rubin, D. C..2006.The Basic-Systems Model of Episodic Memory. Perspectives on Psychological Science 1:277-311 .
- Daselaar, S.M., Rice, H.J., Greenberg, D.L., Cabeza, R., LaBar, K.S., & Rubin, D.C.. 2008. The spatiotemporal dynamics of autobiographical memory: Neural correlates of recall, emotional intensity, and reliving. Cerebral Cortex 217-229 .
- Berntsen, D., & Rubin, D.C..2006. The centrality of event scale: A measure of integrating a trauma into one's identity and its relation to post-traumatic stress disorder symptoms. Behaviour Research and Therapy 44: 219–231.
