= Wiley Interdisciplinary Reviews: Cognitive Science =

- Discipline: Cognitive science
- Language: English

Publication details
- History: 2010–present
- Publisher: John Wiley & Sons
- Frequency: Bimonthly
- Impact factor: 3.476 (2020)

Standard abbreviations
- ISO 4: Wiley Interdiscip. Rev. Cogn. Sci.

Indexing
- ISSN: 1939-5078 (print); 1939-5086 (web)
- LCCN: 2007216048
- OCLC no.: 164585474

Links
- Journal homepage; Online access; Online archive

Wiley Interdisciplinary Reviews: Cognitive Science (WIREs Cognitive Science) is a bimonthly peer-reviewed scientific journal covering cognitive science. The journal was established in 2010 and is published by John Wiley & Sons as a member of its Wiley Interdisciplinary Reviews series. Submissions are by invitation only and focus on research areas at the interfaces of the traditional disciplines. Coverage aims to provide an encyclopedic coverage of the field. The journal does not publish original research papers, but "Editorial Commentaries", "Opinions", "Overviews" (broad and non-technical), "Advanced Reviews" (more typical review articles), and "Focus Articles" (specific real-world issues, examples, and implementations).

== Editors-in-chief ==
The founding editor-in-chief was Lynn Nadel (University of Arizona), who was assisted by a number of associate editors. He was succeeded in 2017 by a group of 8 editors, one each for every section of the journal (with the exception of two editors for "Psychology"):

Name	Affiliation	Section
Melissa Baese-Berk	University of Oregon	Linguistics
Morgan Barense	University of Toronto	Cognitive neuroscience
Paul Michael Corballis	University of Auckland	Psychology
Juan-Carlos Gómez	University of St. Andrews	Cognitive biology
Joseph W. Kable	University of Pennsylvania	Neuroeconomics
Gaia Scerif	University of Oxford	Psychology
Michael J. Spivey	University of California, Merced	Computer science
Wayne Wu	Carnegie Mellon University	Philosophy

== Abstracting and indexing ==
The journal is abstracted and indexed by:

- Current Contents/Social & Behavioral Sciences
- Index Medicus/MEDLINE/PubMed
- PsycINFO
- Scopus
- Social Sciences Citation Index

According to the Journal Citation Reports, the journal has a 2020 impact factor of 3.476, ranking it 22nd out of 91 journals in the category "Psychology, Experimental".

== Awards ==
The Wiley Interdisciplinary Reviews series received the 2009 R.R. Hawkins Award as well as PROSE Awards for "Excellence in Reference Works" and "eProduct/Best Multidiscipline Platform" from the "Professional & Scholarly Publishing Division" (PROSE) of the Association of American Publishers.
