= Episodic =

Episodic may refer to:

- The nature of television series that are divided into short programs known as episodes
- Episodic memory, types of memory that result from specific incidents in a lifetime
- Episodic writing, a publishing format by which a single large work is presented in contiguous (typically chronological) installments
- Episodic video game, a video game of a shorter length that is commercially released as an installment
