= Lynn Nadel =

American psychologist

- Born: November 12, 1942 (age 83)
- Education: McGill University
- Scientific career
- Fields: Psychology
- Workplaces: University of Arizona

Lynn Nadel (born November 12, 1942) is an American psychologist who is the Regents' Professor of psychology at the University of Arizona. Nadel specializes in memory, and has investigated the role of the hippocampus in memory formation. Together with John O'Keefe, he coauthored the influential 1978 book The Hippocampus as a Cognitive Map, which defended the theory that the hippocampus learns and stores cognitive maps of portions of space. With Morris Moscovitch, he advanced the multiple trace theory that the hippocampus is always involved in storage and retrieval of episodic memory, but that semantic memory can be established in the neocortex.

Nadel received a Ph.D. from McGill University in 1967, and joined the faculty of the University of Arizona in 1985, where he is now an Emeritus Professor of Psychology and Cognitive Science. Nadel, together with John O'Keefe, received the 2006 Grawemeyer Award for their work in identifying the brain's mapping system. He was named recipient of a 2019 William James Fellow Award from the Association for Psychological Science for his contributions to cognitive psychology. In 2020 he was the recipient of the Distinguished Scientific Contribution Award from the American Psychological Association. He is an elected member of the National Academy of Sciences. From 2007 to 2016, Nadel was the founding editor-in-chief of the scientific journal, Wiley Interdisciplinary Reviews: Cognitive Science.
