= Early memories =

Early memories may refer to:

In humans

- Childhood amnesia
- Memory#Memory in infancy

In computing

- Computer memory#History
