= David Moore (psychologist) =

American developmental psychologist

- Born: David Scott Moore; August 4, 1960 (age 66)
- Education: Tufts University; Harvard University
- Known for: Behavioral epigenetics
- Scientific career
- Fields: Developmental psychology
- Workplaces: Pitzer College; Claremont Graduate University
- Thesis: Auditory and Visual Integration in Very Young Infants (1988)
- Doctoral advisor: Jerome Kagan

David Scott Moore (born August 4, 1960) is an American developmental psychologist and Professor of Psychology at Pitzer College, where he is the Director of the Claremont Infant Study Center. He is also Professor of Psychology at Claremont Graduate University. His research focuses on cognitive development and mental rotation in infants, as well as behavioral epigenetics. His 2002 book, The Dependent Gene, criticized some of the fundamental assumptions underlying the nature-nurture debate. His 2015 book, The Developing Genome: An Introduction to Behavioral Epigenetics, received positive reviews, and was awarded the American Psychological Association's Eleanor Maccoby and William James Book Awards in 2016. A short précis of the book was subsequently published in WIREs Systems Biology and Medicine. Moore's work has been profiled in The Wall Street Journal, The New York Times, Scientific American, and Parents.

In collaboration with Scott P. Johnson, Moore has demonstrated that infants as young as three to five months of age are capable of mental rotation. Subsequent work revealed that object exploration can facilitate 4-month-olds' mental rotation performances and that early postnatal testosterone exposure and parental attitudes about gender are related to some infants' mental rotation performances.

Moore was the director of the National Science Foundation's Developmental Sciences Program from 2016 to 2018, and he was elected to a three-year term as Member-at-Large of the Division of Developmental Psychology of the American Psychological Association, from 2020 to 2023.

In August 2020, the American Psychological Association, upon the recommendation of the APA Board of Directors, conferred the Fellow status on Moore in recognition of his outstanding contribution in the field of psychology, effective January 2021.
