= Overgeneral autobiographical memory =

- Specialty: Psychology

Overgeneral autobiographical memory (OGM) is an inability to retrieve specific memories from one's autobiographical memory. Instead, general memories are recalled, such as repeated events or events occurring over broad periods. For example, when asked to recall a happy event, a person who exhibits OGM may say, "when I was on vacation last month" instead of remembering a single incident, such as, "my high school graduation." Research shows a correlation between OGM and certain mental illnesses, such as major depressive disorder (MDD) and posttraumatic stress disorder (PTSD).

== Diagnosis ==
The most common way to test for OGM is with the autobiographical memory test (AMT). A participant views cue cards with varying emotional cues (happy, sad, excited, scared, etc.) and is then asked to think of a specific memory in response to it. Most studies utilize the ten word paradigm on the cue cards, where five words are positive and five are negative, but some studies include neutral words (such as fashion or uncle), which increases the total number of cue words. After presentation of the cue word, participants are given 30 seconds to one minute, depending on the study, to come up with a specific memory. If unable to think of a specific memory, the participant is further prompted to think of one specific time or episode, often by the researcher using the phrase "can you think of a specific time—one particular occasion." Memories are considered specific if they occurred once, during a specific time. Responses are normally recorded and transcribed for later coding of overgeneral memories or specific memories. Certain studies code based on the two types of overgeneral memories: categoric and extended memories. Categoric memories include events that occur repeatedly throughout one's life. An example of a categoric memory is "when I went to the store." An extended memory includes events that last more than a day. The memory "when I traveled abroad last year" would be an example of an extended memory. Not all studies differentiate between the two, however.

There are two criticisms over the current research methods for OGM. One involves the use of the AMT, as it is believed that it may not be sensitive enough to detect OGM in nonclinical samples. Additionally, most studies utilizing the AMT use the same cue words, which could be problematic if certain words elicit more OGM than others. It is recommended that varying words in the AMT across studies or the use of additional measures, such as sentence-completion or a different cuing procedure, be utilized in the future to avoid any possible confounds due to the AMT. Secondly, there is a debate between coding OGM through the low number of specific memories ("low memory specificity") or through the high number of overgeneral memories ("high memory overgenerality"). Currently, these two constructs are considered the same within research, but there is cause for concern that they are not equal. In controlling for the possible difference, many meta-analyses will separate research studies based on which variable they use to code for OGM.

== Associations with mental health ==
=== Depression ===
Many research studies have shown a close association between depression and OGM. A study in 1988 found that in-patients with a primary diagnosis of Major Depressive Disorder were more likely to display OGM as compared to a healthy control group. This was the first study of its kind to research the phenomenon of OGM in depressed individuals; prior to this study, OGM had only been found in patients who had attempted suicide. In 2007, a meta-analysis performed by Williams et al. show that OGM is highly associated with depressive symptoms across many studies. In fact, an overgeneral memory is found not only in individuals with MDD, but also in other affective disorders including postpartum depression, dysphoria, and bipolar disorder.

While the 1988 study was influential for the course of future research on OGM and depression, it could not explain why OGM was more common in the depressed individuals, an issue that still plagues OGM research today. Though the causal direction of the relationship between OGM and depression is still uncertain, the presence of an overgeneral memory predicts the course and maintenance of depressive symptoms. For individuals who have seemed to recover from depression, memory often remains overgeneral. In addition, there is evidence that higher levels of OGM predict even greater depressive symptoms up to seven months later. There is considerable evidence that OGM maintains depressive symptoms and acts as a vulnerability factor for recurrence. Failure with interpersonal problem solving, increased rumination, difficulties imagining the future, and avoidance of negative emotions are all associated with OGM and are believed to be key factors in the maintenance of depression. Due to the vast research on depression and OGM, it has been widely accepted that an overgeneral memory is a risk factor for future episodes of depression and can influence the maintenance and length of depressive episodes.

=== Trauma and PTSD ===
Much like in depression, OGM has been associated with trauma and PTSD symptoms, as well as the onset and maintenance of PTSD. However, there has been some debate on whether or not trauma alone is sufficient for the development of OGM, or if PTSD symptoms are necessary. An initial study by Kuyken and Brewin found that patients who had reported past childhood sexual abuse, a trauma, were more likely to exhibit increased OGM as compared to participants who reported no abuse or only physical abuse. PTSD symptoms, however, were not reported in this sample. In effort to locate the particular effects of PTSD, McNally and colleagues compared OGM occurrence in Vietnam veterans with and without PTSD. The study found that the veterans with a PTSD diagnosis significantly displayed more OGM, even when depression status was controlled for. This study led credence to the idea that it was the development of PTSD that led to the vulnerability of OGM, and not just exposure to trauma. To focus on this particular issue and figure out if it is trauma exposure or PTSD symptoms that are necessary for the development of OGM, Moore and Zoellner reviewed 24 studies. They concluded that trauma alone is not sufficient to produce OGM and that PTSD symptoms are significantly associated with OGM. While the causal direction between OGM and PTSD is still unknown, Moore and Zoellner conclude that PTSD symptoms, such as intrusive memories and avoidance of reminders, are necessary for OGM.

=== Childhood trauma ===
While most initial research focused on OGM in adults, current research is looking at this phenomenon in children. It is hypothesized that childhood trauma could lead to future OGM. Indeed, Williams originally predicted that childhood trauma was necessary for the development of OGM. In 1995, a study looked at the relationship between childhood abuse and current OGM. Participants in the study took the autobiographical memory test and were asked about past sexual and physical abuse. This was the first study that showed a correlation between childhood trauma, specifically sexual abuse, and OGM. A similar study in 2003 corroborated these findings. In a study examining inpatient adolescents, it was found that self-reported abuse was significantly correlated with OGM, especially for positively valenced cues. In effort to avoid retrospective reports on abuse, recent research has been examining OGM in families currently involved with social services. Valentino, Toth, and Cicchetti published a study in 2009 that examined the type of maltreatment a child experienced and current OGM. Participants were recruited via the local Department of Human Services and included families with a substantiated report of abuse or neglect. Compared to both a nonmaltreated group and the neglected group, children who experienced abuse displayed more OGM. In addition to being the first study to look at current maltreatment and OGM, the idea of trauma as a pathway to OGM is significantly supported here, as depression did not mediate the relationship between abuse and OGM. Additionally, neglected children may not have a specific trauma that they attempt to avoid, thus their memory search may not be affected.

=== Other ===
OGM has been researched in other psychopathological disorders, including anxiety disorder, social phobia, specific phobias, borderline personality disorder and eating disorders without any associations found. It is proposed that OGM is a specific marker of emotional and affect disorders such as depression and PTSD.

== Cause ==
Initial theories of OGM focused on encoding and retrieval. Memories are encoded based on distinctive traits of what has happened; however, without proper encoding of a memory, the event will not be remembered in any great detail. The hypothesis that stemmed from this idea is that those who have dysfunctional encoding abilities would display greater OGM. With the addition of research on the relationship between depressive symptoms and OGM, the focus shifted. Williams proposed that depressed patients may be more vulnerable to this general encoding style, leaving them with an inability to recall specific aspects of events. However, it was not long until theories on OGM transitioned from a focus on encoding and retrieval to retrieval alone.

In 1996, Williams proposed the theory of Functional Avoidance (FA) as the pathway to OGM. When a person experiences a traumatic event that could trigger negative emotions, the person may attempt to avoid that memory as a short-term coping strategy. Over time, this memory retrieval style becomes negatively reinforced and generalizes to other memories that could potentially be connected to the original negative memory, leading to OGM. However, with additional research on memory and OGM, the theory of Functional Avoidance could not be upheld on its own.

=== Current theory ===
In 2000, Conway and Pleydell-Pearce came up with an improved theory of autobiographical memory, inspiring Williams to revise and expand his theory of OGM into the current CaR-FA-X model (Capture and Rumination, Functional Avoidance, and Impairment in Executive Capacity). The new model of autobiographical memory relies heavily on the hierarchical nature of memory. Specifically, the model proposes that autobiographical memory can be broken down into four categories: conceptual themes, lifetime periods, general events, and event-specific knowledge. As one moves down the hierarchy, memories become more specific. The Conway and Pleydell-Pearce model suggests that OGM may have multiple causal pathways and that OGM cannot be explained solely by the theory of Functional Avoidance. To address these concerns, Williams' CaR-FA-X model specifically describes three pathways of how a person may develop OGM, though the interactions of the three factors may underlie OGM development as well. The first component of the theory, Capture and Rumination (CaR), refers to the idea that a person with negative self-beliefs may access general memories that remind them of their selves as they search for a memory, causing the person to be "captured" at the general level and ruminating on the idea, ending any deeper search for a specific memory. For example, when prompted with the cue word "sad," a person may think of a general event such as "sad when people ignore me." This thought, in turn, can lead to other thoughts centered on their negative self-beliefs, such as "why don't people like me," "I'm never good enough," etc., so a particular and specific event is never accessed. This error is often found in individuals who score high on ruminative thinking, such that individuals with negative self-belief may be specifically likely to develop OGM through this pathway.

In Williams' revised model, Functional Avoidance (FA) remains relatively unchanged. Individuals who have experienced a traumatic event and who have developed depressive symptoms or PTSD symptoms seem vulnerable to developing OGM via this route, as they will be more prone to having a specific memory that elicits negative affect. As previously noted, it is believed that FA develops from a maladaptive coping style: the initial avoidance of the particular memory allows the individual to reduce emotional distress, though as this memory retrieval style is reinforced over time, it generalizes to other memories and becomes an impairment.

The third pathway toward OGM involves Impairment in Executive Capacity (X). As described by Williams, autobiographical memory retrieval requires working memory capacity, the ability to maintain working memory, and inhibition of irrelevant information. In relation to testing for OGM, Sumner points out that executive control is necessary to even complete the autobiographical memory test, as the instructions must be kept in working memory as the person searches and retrieves a memory. It is most likely that this pathway would be implicated in individuals who have impaired cognitive processing due to trauma-related events or depression. Research shows that individuals with PTSD are more likely to have intrusive memories, which takes away from their cognitive resources. Additionally, individuals prone to depression and rumination may be unable to inhibit irrelevant ideas of the self, which would explain how the individual may become captured on the general level.

Most research has focused on the separate pathways of each parts of the CaR-FA-X model; however, Williams predicts that there is an interaction between them. This is especially prominent for the Impairment in Executive Capacity, as a failure in inhibition and working memory can help explain both Capture and Rumination and Functional Avoidance.

The current CaR-FA-X model seems promising in regard to describing pathways of OGM. A meta-analysis by Sumner in 2012 verified the plausibility of Williams' CaR-FA-X model across 38 studies examining OGM. However, it is widely established that more research will be necessary in order to fully describe OGM effects in particular populations and under certain contexts. For example, a review of OGM in 2013 revealed many gaps in the literature in regard to OGM in childhood, calling for additional theoretical research for this age group.

== Treatment ==
Initial research viewed OGM as a trait-like cognitive style that would be resistant to change. Studies repeatedly concluded that OGM did not only persist after reducing symptoms of depression or PTSD, but that this type of memory retrieval remained a vulnerability factor for recurrence of symptoms. By the year 2000, researchers shifted their focus to view memory retrieval styles as malleable instead of fixed, and the concept of memory specificity training was introduced.

Based on mindfulness-based cognitive therapy (MBCT), Williams, et al. (2000) found that this intervention effectively reduced OGM and symptoms of depression as compared to a control group. Though MBCT was not developed as a memory-specificity training intervention, the core idea of MBCT is awareness. This type of therapy focuses on teaching the person how to be more aware of their environment, allowing memories to be encoded at a higher specificity, and to be more aware of their own thought processes, allowing the person to recognize when their mind wanders and how to come back to the present situation. The finding that an already developed intervention program could reduce OGM was promising and galvanized further research on intervention programs for OGM.

In effort to develop an intervention program directly targeting memory specificity improvement, Raes, Williams, and Hermans (2009) developed the MEmory Specificity Training (MEST) intervention. In their initial study, ten inpatient women experiencing depression participated in this group-based intervention over the course of four weeks. The group met once a week in one-hour sessions, where they learned about OGM and practiced recalling specific memories. The initial session presented research on OGM and discussed examples of specific memories, while the last three sessions focused on recalling multiple specific memories for a particular cue word. The last session also included a metacognitive component, focusing on how to recognize when thoughts are becoming too general. Homework was given after every session to promote further experiences recalling specific memories. While this initial study did not include a control group, the women showed dramatic improvements in reducing OGM. Additionally, the participants also displayed reductions in rumination and feelings of hopelessness, independent of reduced depressive symptoms.

Given the methodological issues of Raes et al.'s study, another research group tested MEST under more stringent conditions. Using random assignment, a control group, and follow-up testing, Neshat-Doost et al. (2013) corroborated the initial findings that MEST is successful in reducing OGM and promoting more specific memory recall. While the MEST intervention group and the control group did not differ significantly in depression post-training, the MEST intervention group displayed a significant decrease in depressive symptoms at the two-month follow up, whereas the control group remained unchanged. As in the initial study by Raes et al., changes in OGM and depressive symptoms were found to be independent of each other, though reduced OGM was correlated with reduced depression.

These successes showing that OGM can be reduced through intervention is significant. As OGM is thought to be part of the core mechanism predicting the course and maintenance of depression and PTSD, altering this cognitive style could prevent recurrence of symptoms. However, research on interventions targeting memory specificity is in an early stage, and more research will be necessary to see how long the effects last post-intervention.

== History ==
Research on OGM stemmed from the mood-memory research of the latter 20th century. Initial studies displayed an association between depression and a failure to remember positive events, with the explanation being that the depressed individual had an excess of negative memories. However, in 1986, J. Mark G. Williams and Keith Broadbent examined patterns of autobiographical memory in people who recently attempted suicide. When compared to a healthy control group, the suicidal group displayed a general memory, especially for positively valenced cues. This study contradicted past research by explaining that the bias to remember negative events is not due to an excess of negative memories, but is because of an overgeneral memory. Since this initial study, research on OGM has expanded and has been further implicated in the risk to and maintenance of depression and PTSD.
