= Fading affect bias =

Memory bias affecting emotional memory

The fading affect bias, more commonly known as FAB, is a psychological phenomenon in which memories associated with negative emotions tend to be forgotten more quickly than those associated with positive emotions. FAB only refers to the feelings one has associated with the memories and not the content of the memories themselves. Early research studied FAB retrospectively, or through personal reflection, which brought about some criticism because retrospective analysis can be affected by subjective retrospective biases. However, new research using non-retrospective recall studies have found evidence for FAB, and the phenomenon has become largely accepted.

== Description and background ==
Some of the earliest evidence for the Fading Affect Bias dates back to a study by Cason (1932). Cason's study using a retrospective procedure where participants recalled and rated past events and emotion when prompted found that recalled emotional intensity for positive events was generally stronger than that of negative events.

Landau and Gunter (2009) showed that the FAB occurs regardless of whether the experience is shared between one person or a group of people that share that memory. People's recall of an event, the negative affective quality of the event can lessen. And the fading affect bias can have an effect on the memory.

Initially, the Fading Affect Bias was widely accepted as the process whereby the emotional valence of certain events fades over time. More specifically, early researchers largely believed that there was a general fading over time of emotional content and intensity in relation to specific life events, regardless of whether the experiences were positive or negative. However, later studies found emotional intensity of negative events to dissipate at a faster rate than positively perceived events. Furthermore, not only are the negative emotions toward the event fading over time, but the ability to recall the negative event memory fades overtime as well. Growing evidence has also acknowledged the tendency for originally negative events to shift over time and be viewed in a more positive way. The FAB exists universally across cultures, and increases in intensity as we age.

Due to the fading of negative event memories, the autobiographical memory of an individual is skewed in a positive light. The FAB is an essential counterpart to the positive affect bias, as it allows and promotes the salience of positive emotional memories. It also plays an important role in positive personal event memory trends essential to the Pollyanna Principle.

Views opposing the FAB concern the idea that negative memories and negative experiences are more salient than positive ones and therefore negative memories would not be subject to recall fading. The first opposing idea is based on the "bad is stronger than good" theory, and is therefore more salient, in terms of affective fading. This view contrary to fading affect bias argues that due to the nature of the self, we are more inclined to focus on and remember negative events. This theory focuses on the belief that human nature is based around negative experiences, memories, and emotions. These are more shaping than all others in regard to the hedonistic view. Those that came up with the "bad is stronger than good" theory talk about how nature itself has been shaped by negative experiences. Things that are better attuned to negative things are also more adaptive and able to survive better. This effect can feed into every aspect of life. Yet, despite this theory, research has also shown that people often recall positive events more often and clearly than negative events, which opposes the idea that "bad is stronger than good".

Another opposing idea to fading affect bias, a stems from the Freudian theory of repression, that in order for repression to occur, the negative emotion associated with the traumatic event would have to remain. The diminishing of these memories via FAB could possibly make repression incapable of occurring, at least according to this interpretation of the concept of repression. However, this idea has been attributed to Freud despite it has been noted that it is only an extension of the Freudian view and not a direct statement of that view. Therefore, none of this views represent solid arguments against FAB and the growing body of evidence seems to solidify its existence.

== Research history ==
Criticism of the Cason (1932) study centered around the fact that retrospective and introspective procedures could be subject to memory biases. A later study—Holmes (1970)—took a "non-introspective" approach to studying FAB using a record of diary events that included the emotional intensity of the event. Twenty-six subjects were told to record events in a diary and record the emotional intensities of the experiences. Results from these studies were found to be generally consistent with FAB.

A study by Walker et al. (1997) discussed the role which memory plays in FAB using diary recording to analyze cognitive processes. Here, it is stated that human beings are preferential in what they select to remember and that certain particulars of events fade, but not emotions. This study found that emotions prompted by positive events were more likely to last than those prompted by negative occurrences.

Ritchie et al. (2009) used subject's personal responses to 1200 autobiographical events to study the Fading Affect Bias. In this study, four possible trends were found regarding memory: the Fixed Affect (wherein emotional intensity is maintained), the Fading Affect (wherein emotional intensity diminishes), the Flourishing Affect (where there is an increase in intensity), and the Flexible Affect (where there is a reversal of valence). For positive recollections, the Fixed Affect was more prominent (39%) than the Fading Affect (37%). However, for negative occurrences, the Fading Affect was more prominent (51%) than the Fixed Affect (38%). Reiterating the bias towards the fading of negative memories.

In addition to the aforementioned psychological studies, related neurobiological studies were conducted that could possibly further explain the phenomenon of FAB. During an interview, neurobiologist Matt Wilson detailed that in studying the brain activity of rats it was found that the remembrance of past events and the anticipation of future events seemed to be linked neurologically. This is a possible implication of why FAB exists: the human need to catalog relevant information to be used in the future.

== Memory types ==
FAB is most commonly observed in autobiographical event memories, however it has been explored across different memory types.

=== Flashbulb memories ===
A study by Bohn & Berntsen (2007) used the falling of the Berlin Wall to observe how the FAB affects flashbulb memories. East and West Germans were asked to rate their feelings toward the fall of the Berlin Wall when it happened and their current feelings towards the event. They found that individuals with positive feelings about it when the wall fell maintained their positive feelings at time of recall. Those who viewed the fall of The Wall as negative had less negative emotions attached to the event at time of recall. The salience of FAB outside of autobiographical event recall, such as flashbulb memory recall, strengthens the argument for this phenomenon being universal.

With flashbulb memories the study found a bias in memory immersion. When asked to focus on a positive flashbulb memory the person tended to re-immerse themselves into the memory and the memories were seen as shaping parts of their lives. The accuracy of these memories was susceptible to change in this mental reconstruction. When asked to focus on a negative flashbulb memory the person would not have this immersion as they did not want to associate as much with these negative experiences. However, the accuracy of negative flashbulb memory was far higher. FAB is thought to have a significant effect on how these memories are maintained within the mind.

=== Dreams ===
Ritchie & Skowronski (2008) asked individuals to keep dream journals in which they rated their feelings about their dreams when they happened and were later asked to recall how they felt about those same dreams. In line with previous findings about the nature of the FAB and autobiographical memory, positive affect at time of occurrence and at time of recall decreased slower than that of negative affect. An interesting finding in this study was that the FAB was mitigated by the use of recreational drugs.

== Moderating factors ==
=== Social moderators ===
==== Rehearsal ====
Sharing and repeating one's memories with others can effectively change one's perception of the memory and the emotions attached to it. Frequently sharing memories with others can increase recall of positive event memories and effectively decrease negative event memories, thus promoting positive event memory recall. To amplify effects of the FAB, frequent, repeated, social disclosure of event memories, perceived as social support is integral. Overall, the sharing of events with others can positively influence the way an individual remembers events, however self-rehearsal does not yield the same results, as it is linked to a lack of affective fading overall. Self-rehearsal can allow the subject to maintain the vividness of both positive and negative of the memory. The effect that rehearsal has on FAB can also possibly be explained by the relationship between event rehearsal and memory retainment and vividness

=== Personality moderators ===
==== Anxiety ====
FAB's effectiveness can be affected by anxiety. Depending on the amount of anxiety a person is experiencing the effectiveness of FAB can be reduced. Increased levels of anxiety lowered FAB for both positive and negative events. This has been found in multiple studies showing anxiety has a powerful effect on FAB. Those with higher anxiety seem to show that increased levels of anxiety may produce a greater sense of awareness that amplify the emotional aspects of their memory of an event.

Something to consider from these findings is that those that suffer from anxiety report more emotional experiences, and a poorer understanding of their own emotions. These people recall experiences with more emotion than was originally there but struggle to define those emotions within the memory. Studies have looked at this in relation to those with trait anxiety who are stuck in a state of anticipating a threat whether real or perceived. Other studies have shown that individuals that suffer with higher levels of anxiety do not have to be consciously aware that perceived threats are distracting them and creating more anxiety for themselves (Bishop, 2007). Those experiencing higher levels of anxiety seem to experience these effects more than others, which likely affects how they experience the world and how they recall autobiographical memories.

==== Depression ====
The presence of depression or dysphoria can moderate the effectiveness of FAB. The overall contents of autobiographical memories between depressed and non-depressed individuals differ in that a dysphoric autobiographical memory has more negative event memories. As found in multiple studies, the disproportionate amount of negative memories of a dysphoric individual can be attributed to the interruption of the FAB. Negative memories tend to fade slower in dysphorics than in non-dysphorics, and furthermore dysphorics' positive memories and negative memories seem to fade at similar rates.

==== Narcissism ====
Narcissists are seen as having extremely high levels of self-esteem, thus one would believe they have an elevated FAB, however this is not the case. The more narcissistic an individual is, it has been found, the less of an FAB effect is present. An exception to this depends on the type of event memory that is being recalled. When the focus of the event memory is the narcissist or something that they did, the FAB is present. However, when focused on a memory involving a group or community, FAB was not present. There is some evidence that those with low levels of narcissism experience the FAB effect more and that there is a correlation between levels of narcissism and FAB. The moderation of the FAB by narcissism provides more evidence that FAB is an indicator of healthy emotional regulation

=== Emotional moderators ===
==== Mood ====
It is a common misconception when looking at the FAB that the mood state of the individual during recall will significantly impact their perception of the event. For example, a person is only looking back at a negative event with a positive lens because they are currently in a good mood. A study by Ritchie et al. (2009) found this to be partially true in that the most positive individuals at time of recall have a more pertinent FAB effect, however FAB was still experienced by everyone no matter their emotional state, reinforcing that FAB is a universal experience that functions beyond the current emotional state.

== Possible explanations ==
FAB is regarded as a generally beneficial occurrence. A popular explanation for the FAB among psychologists and researchers alike, is the need for healthy self-awareness, self-regulation and positive self view. Effectively regulating negative emotions in autobiographical memories reduces maladaptive future behavior and allows for the enhancing of the self. FAB allows for successful social navigation by promoting the retention of positive experiences, thus allowing for an individual to be open to new experiences as modeled in the Broaden-and-Build theory. This is further supported by evidence which shows that individuals with depression, a maladaptive disorder, experience interference with FAB by retaining negative emotions from unpleasant memories. FAB may also be attributed to one's drive to protect oneself from recalling traumatic experiences and may also explain why negative experiences may feel farther away in time than they actually are. Overall, the fading affect bias is seen as an adaptive behavior in healthy individuals that allows for a more positive outlook on life

== Cultural considerations ==
Much of the research for FAB has been done almost exclusively in the US. Time and again the results and effects of FAB are shown in normal life and within the lab. There is a concern that FAB is only prevalent within the US and that it could reflect US attitude of "looking to the brightside." In light of this Ritchie and associates did a test of 10 different samples from 6 different universities with access to diverse ethnic backgrounds. FAB occurred in every sample regardless of background establishing a solid foundation that FAB seems to be universal. Knowing that FAB is universal doesn't mean that it as prevalent in all cultures though. Culture effectively standardizes the customs and rituals that formalize the human relationships according to the core groups' value system. It, therefore, enables individuals and groups to reduce stress by anticipating events. Different cultures experience stress, depression and these other emotions differently, which can greatly affect how prevalent FAB is within that particular culture.

== Resources and studies ==
=== Studies ===
- Cason, Hulsey (1932). "The Learning and Retention of Pleasant and Unpleasant Activities". Archives of Psychology. 134: 1–96. Abstract
- Walker, W. Richard; Vogl, Rodney J.; Thompson, Charles P. (1997). "Autobiographical memory: unpleasantness fades faster than pleasantness over time" (PDF). Applied Cognitive Psychology. 11 (5): 399–413. doi:10.1002/(sici)1099-0720(199710)11:5<399::aid-acp462>3.3.co;2-5. Archived from the original on 2016-05-14.
- Ritchie, Timothy; Skowronski, John J.; Hartnett, Jessica; Wells, Brett; Walker, W. Richard (April 2009). "The fading affect bias in the context of emotion activation level, mood, and personal theories of emotion change" (PDF). Memory. 17 (4): 428–444. doi:10.1080/09658210902791665. ISSN 0965-8211. PMID 19358015. S2CID 33746366.
- Gibbons, Jeffrey A.; Lee, Sherman A.; Walker, W. Richard (2011). "The fading affect bias begins within 12 hours and persists for 3 months". Applied Cognitive Psychology. 25 (4): 663–672. doi:10.1002/acp.1738.
- Noreen, Saima; MacLeod, Malcolm D. (2013). "It's all in the detail: Intentional forgetting of autobiographical memories using the autobiographical think/no-think task". Journal of Experimental Psychology: Learning, Memory, and Cognition. 39 (2): 375–393. doi:10.1037/a0028888. PMID 22686849.
  - "Remembering to Forget". Neuroscience News. 22 June 2012.
