= The Dependent Gene =

2002 book by psychologist David Moore

The Dependent Gene: The Fallacy of "Nature vs. Nurture"
- Author: David S. Moore
- Language: English
- Subject: Developmental systems theory; Genetic determinism
- Genre: Nonfiction
- Publisher: Times Books; Henry Holt & Company
- Publication date: 2002
- Pages: 320
- ISBN: 978-0-7167-4024-7

The Dependent Gene: The Fallacy of "Nature vs. Nurture" is a book by developmental psychologist David S. Moore, originally published in 2002 by Times Books and Henry Holt & Company. The book is highly critical of genetic determinism and the nature-nurture debate, emphasizing that gene action is highly dependent on social and biological factors in the organism's environment. In doing so, it draws on developmental systems theory to present an interactionist approach to the science of genetics. Among the examples Moore cites in the book is that of phenylketonuria (PKU), which is caused by a mutation in a single gene, but can easily be treated through dietary intervention. He argues that PKU, like all traits, is both genetic and environmental in origin. He also critiques the fundamental concept of a discrete "gene", arguing that the function-based boundaries that are claimed to separate genes from one another have changed over time.

== Reception ==
Robert Lickliter and Hunter Honeycutt reviewed The Dependent Gene favorably, writing, "Using a wealth of clear examples to highlight the complex transactions between genes and environment at every stage of biological and psychological development, Moore presents a powerful antidote to gene-centered explanations of human behavior and cognition by articulating a perspective in which development really matters." They also praised the style in which the book was written: "Moore’s clear, casual style makes this message and its consequences for the traditional gene-centered neo-Darwinian view of evolution accessible to a wide range of nonspecialists, including advanced undergraduates and graduate students in the behavioral and cognitive sciences." The book was also reviewed favorably in Publishers Weekly, which wrote, "Scientists and social service providers will be intrigued by this well-written, insightful and far more optimistic view of human development and evolution than most that have come before." Julie Buckles, writing in Genome News Network, was more critical in her review of the book. She concluded, "By the end, I found myself more confused than convinced. Moore complains, with some validity, about "the tendency of journalists to excitedly report not-yet-proven associations between traits and genes." Though he makes a well-meaning effort to clarify a complex area of biology, his treatment of the material is unlikely to serve as a primer for the general public."

== See also ==
- The Agile Gene
