= Childhood amnesia =

Inability of adults to recall memories from childhood

Childhood amnesia, also called infantile amnesia, is the inability of adults to retrieve episodic memories (memories of situations or events) before the age of three to four years. It may also refer to the scarcity or fragmentation of memories recollected from early childhood, particularly those from between the ages of 3 and 6. On average, this fragmented period wanes at around 4.7 years. Around 5–6 years of age in particular is thought to be when autobiographical memory seems to stabilize and be on par with adults. The development of a cognitive self is also thought by some to have an effect on encoding and storing early memories.

Some research has demonstrated that children can remember events from before the age of three, but that these memories may decline as children get older. Psychologists differ in defining the onset of childhood amnesia. Some define it as the age from which a first memory can be retrieved. This is usually the third birthday, but it can range from three to four years in general.

Changes in encoding, storage and retrieval of memories during early childhood are all factors when considering childhood amnesia.

== History ==
Childhood amnesia was first formally reported by psychologist Caroline Miles in her 1895 American Journal of Psychology article "A study of individual psychology". Five years later, Henri and Henri published a survey showing that the average age of the respondents' earliest recollections was three years and one month. In 1904 G. Stanley Hall noted the phenomenon in his book, Adolescence: Its Psychology and Its Relations to Physiology, Anthropology, Sociology, Sex, Crime, Religion and Education. In 1910, Sigmund Freud offered one of the most famous and controversial descriptions and explanations of childhood amnesia. Using psychoanalytic theory—but no science-based evidence—he postulated that early life events were repressed due to their inappropriately sexual nature. He asserted that childhood or infantile amnesia was a precursor to the "hysterical amnesia", or repression, presented by his adult patients. Freud asked his patients to recall their earliest memories and found that they had difficulty remembering events from before the age of six to eight. Freud coined the term "infantile" or "childhood amnesia" and discussed this phenomenon in his Three Essays on the Theory of Sexuality. To date, no experimental studies have found any evidence to support Freud's ideas. In 1972, Campbell and Spear published a seminal review about childhood amnesia in Psychological Sciences recapping the research conducted to understand this topic from neurological and behavioral perspectives in both human and animal models.

== Methods of recall ==
The method of memory retrieval can influence what can be recalled. Specifically, different results are obtained when someone is prompted to remember a specific event, given more general guidelines, or asked to recall any memory possible.

=== Cued ===
Many studies use cued recall to retrieve memories. In its basic form, the experimenter gives the participant a word, and the participant responds with the first memory they think of associated with that word. This method has generally estimated the age of offset at about three to five but can vary. There are several objections to the cue method. One is that memory is recorded per cue word, so it can be difficult to know whether this memory is their earliest memory or the first that came to mind. It may be a problem if participants are not asked to record the earliest memory they can recall that relates to the cue. If the experimenter asks the participant to specifically use childhood memories or the earliest memories associated with a cue, the age estimate can be two to eight years. Even with this measure, cued recall is useful only for bringing to mind memories formed several months after the introduction of that word into the participant's vocabulary. A 2013 study by Bauer and Larkina used cued recall by asking children and adults to state a personal memory related to the word and then state the earliest time that it occurred. The researchers found that the younger children need more prompts or cues. For children and adults, the earliest memory retrieval was around three years old.

=== Free ===
Free recall refers to the specific paradigm in the psychological study of memory where participants study a list of items on a specific trial and are then prompted to recall the items in any order. In regard to childhood amnesia, free recall is the process by which experimenters ask people for their earliest memories and allow them to respond freely. There is no significant difference when people are instructed to recall their earliest memories with cued recall compared to free recall. It is thought that a major benefit of free recall is that every question gets answered, which may, in turn, elicit memories from an earlier age.

=== Exhaustive ===
In the exhaustive recall method, participants are asked to record all the memories they can access before a specific age. This method, like free recall, relies on participants to come up with memories without cues. Exhaustive recall yields a better understanding than other methods of the number of memories surviving from early childhood but can be demanding for the subjects, who often have to spend many hours trying to remember events from their childhood. No major differences among word-cued, interview, focused, and exhaustive recall have been found.

== Accessible and inaccessible memories ==
The number of early childhood memories a person can recall depends on many factors, including the emotion associated with the event, their age at the time of the remembered event, and the age at the time they are asked to recall an early memory. It is often assumed that not recalling a childhood memory means one has forgotten the event, but there is a difference between availability and accessibility. The availability of a memory is its intactness and existence within memory storage, while its accessibility is dictated by the context in which one attempts to recall it. Therefore, cues may influence which memories are accessible at any given time, even though there may be many more available memories that are not accessed. Other research suggests that people's earliest memories date back to the ages of 3 or 4 years. Usher and Neisser reported that some events, like the birth of a sibling and a planned hospitalization, can be readily remembered if they occurred at age 2. The bits and pieces of such memories that were obtained in their research may not be indicative of genuine episodic memory. An alternative hypothesis is that these apparent memories are the result of educated guesses, general knowledge of what must have been, or external information acquired after the age of 2.

According to a study by West and Bauer, earlier memories tend to have less emotional content than later memories, and to be less personally meaningful, unique, or intense. Earlier memories also do not tend to differ greatly in perspective. Certain life events do result in clearer and earlier memories. Adults find it easier to remember personal, rather than public, event memories from early childhood. This means a person would remember getting a dog, but not the appearance of Halley's Comet. Psychologists have debated the age of adults' earliest memories. Most modern data suggests somewhere between the ages 3 and 4 on average. Some research shows that the offset of childhood amnesia (earliest age of recall) is 2 years of age for hospitalization and sibling birth and 3 years of age for death or change in houses. Thus, some memories are available from earlier in childhood than previous research suggested.

Some research suggests that until around the age of 4, children cannot form context-rich memories. More evidence is needed, but the relative lack of episodic memories of early childhood may be linked to maturation of prefrontal cortex. It also suggest adults can access fragment memories (isolated moments without context, often remembered as images, behaviors, or emotions) from around age 3, whereas event memories are usually recalled from slightly later. This is similar to research showing the difference between personal recollections and known events. Known memories change to more personal recollections at approximately 4 3/4 years of age.

== Fading memories ==
Children can form memories at younger ages than adults can recall. While the efficiency of encoding and storage processes allows older children to remember more, younger children also have great memory capacity. Infants can remember the actions of sequences, the objects used to produce them, and the order in which the actions unfold, suggesting that they possess the precursors necessary for autobiographical memory. Children's recall is 51% accurate for events that happened before the age of two whereas adults remember nearly nothing before that age. By age two, children can retrieve memories after several weeks, indicating that these memories could become relatively enduring and could explain why some people have memories from so early. Children also show an ability to nonverbally recall events that occurred before they had the vocabulary to describe them, whereas adults do not. Findings such as these prompted research into when and why people lose these previously accessible memories.

Some suggest that as children age, they lose the ability to recall preverbal memories. One explanation for this is that a person develops linguistic skills, memories that were not encoded verbally are lost. This theory also explains why many early memories are fragmented: the nonverbal components were lost. Contrary findings indicate that elementary-aged children remember more accurate details about events than they had reported at a younger age and that 6- to 9-year-old children tend to have verbally accessible memories from very early childhood. Research on animal models seems to indicate that childhood amnesia is not only due to the development of language or any other human faculty.

This increased ability for children to remember their early years does not start to fade until children reach double digits. By age 11, children exhibit young-adult levels of childhood amnesia. These findings may indicate that some aspect of the adolescent brain, or the neurobiological processes of adolescence, prompts the development of childhood amnesia.

== Animal models ==
The phenomenon of infantile amnesia is not specific to humans. Research in rat models found that younger rats forget a conditioned avoidance response to a shock-paired compartment faster than older rats do. These findings have been replicated in a number of other species with different learning paradigms. These studies have informed neurobiological findings about childhood amnesia and would be impossible to ethically conduct in humans.

Because infantile amnesia has been observed in animals, the occurrence cannot be explained just by cognition specific to humans such as reading and writing or an understanding of self. A main criticism of animal models is that development and cognition in animals and humans are starkly different. Researchers have attempted to address this by creating timelines for animal development based on changes in learning and memory abilities, brain development, and hormones.

Research on rat models indicates that failures in memory retrieval cause infantile amnesia. In a study on rats, it was found that one single "reminder" before a test was enough to reduce forgetting in infant rats. A similar study was done on infants, showing that a behavior that was typically forgotten in a few days could be remembered if the subject was exposed to the reinforcer before a test. These studies indicate that these memories being not lost, but rather not retrieved.

== Individual differences ==
Many factors affect memory in humans, including gender and culture. Differences in early memory between these groups can tell us about potential causes and implications of childhood amnesia. The individual differences mean that elaborative parenting styles and emphasis of cultural history when teaching children may result in recollection of earlier childhood memories. This suggests that childhood amnesia offset is modifiable by parenting and teaching styles and is therefore not exclusively predetermined or entirely biological.

=== Sex ===
Generally, when a sex discrepancy is found in the age at first memories, females have earlier memories than males. Women's earlier first memories may be accounted for by the fact that mothers generally have more elaborative, evaluative, and emotional reminiscent style with daughters than with sons, which has been shown to result in more richly detailed childhood memories. Women across cultures tend to have more information-dense memories than men, and women tend to refer to others more than themselves in their earliest memories. Men exhibit more early memory focus on themselves. Men have been found more likely than women to mention bad memories. Contrarily, studies have shown that women are more likely to remember traumatic and transitional events, whereas men more often remember play events. Early recollections have also been found to be more accurate in their reflections of friendliness for men and dominance for women.

=== Ethnicity, culture, and society ===
MacDonald et al. found that Chinese participants had later first memories than New Zealand European (Pākehā) or Māori participants. This effect was due to Chinese women, whose average age at first memory was 6.1 years. This indicates that Chinese women have later first memories than Chinese men, which differs from the general finding that women report earlier first memories than men. It has been suggested that since sons are prized far over daughters in China, parents may have more elaborate, evaluative, and emotional reminiscent styles with boys than with girls. Among American subjects, it has been found that black women have later memories than black men or white women. Black women also tend to report a low proportion of personal experience which is independently correlated with being older at the age of first memory. It may be that white parents are likelier to use directives to elaborately reminisce than black parents are with daughters in African-American culture.

Findings that Korean people have significantly later first memories than Americans were originally thought to be caused by the collectivist nature of Asian cultures. The lack of an age discrepancy between Chinese men and New Zealand Europeans casts doubt on this theory. Additionally, studies on the African-American population, which is considered a more collectivist society, have not indicated later first memories than non-collectivist cultures. It has been shown that children from Western cultures tell more elaborate, detailed, and emotional narratives than children from Eastern cultures.

Māori adults report significantly earlier memories than either Pākehā or Chinese individuals. The traditional emphasis on the past in Māori culture may have led to an earlier understanding of the nature of time, and to the retrieval of earlier memories. Māori are also more likely than Pākehā or Chinese individuals to indicate a family story as a source for their memory.

=== Personality ===
People's first memories significantly reflect their personality traits. People who reveal a more detailed memory are more likely to be open in their daily lives and disclose a range of personal information to others. Characteristics of early recollections are reflective of friendliness for males and dominance for females.

=== Forgetfulness ===
Even when childhood events are not remembered episodically, they can be implicitly remembered. Humans can be primed and implicitly trained before they can remember facts or autobiographical events. Adults can generally recall events from 3–4 years old, with those that have primarily experiential memories beginning around 4.7 years old. Adults who experienced traumatic or abusive early childhoods report a longer period of childhood amnesia, ending around 5–7 years old. One possible cause for this is stress-related injury to the brain, as trauma damages memory centers and disrupts recall.

This evidence for delayed and impaired recall of trauma due to the trauma itself is contrary to the concept of repressed memories, wherein traumatic memories are stored intact in order to protect the subject and can be recovered with full accompanying narrative. Since priming can occur at a younger age than episodic recall, children in abusive situations may form implicit memory connections of violence even when no true episodic recall exists.

=== Falsity ===
Very few adults have memories from before 3.5 years old. Those who do report memories from before this age usually cannot tell the difference between personal memory of the event and simple knowledge of it, which may have come from other sources. One study found that participants were more able to correctly remember memories that occurred around the age of 10, while memories from before age 3 were more often confused with false images and memories. Memories from early childhood (around age three) are susceptible to false suggestion, making them less trustworthy. Imagining details of a false event can generate false memories. Studies have shown that people who imagine a childhood event are likelier to believe it happened to them compared to events they did not imagine. This phenomenon has been called imagination inflation and shows that imagining an event can make it seem more plausible that it happened. Similarly, people who are shown doctored photographs of themselves as children in an event that never occurred can create false memories of the event by imagining the event over time. This implies it is possible for false memories to be generated in and/or fed by a court case. This concern has led the American Psychiatric Association to advise caution in accepting memories of physically and sexually abusive events from before the age of two. It also recommends that these memories not be entirely discounted, due to the nature of the crimes.

=== Maternal narrative style ===
Researchers who have used maternal narrative style as a predictor for early childhood memory recall have found that children whose mothers frequently and elaborately reminisced events with the child were able to recall earlier first memories. Studies also show that when mothers include emotional context when reminiscing with their children, the child is likely to grow up with a more secure attachment style, as well as show higher levels of emotional understanding and a stronger sense of self. These factors all contribute to the child developing stronger autobiographical memory skills.

== Proposed explanations ==
=== Freud's trauma theory ===
Sigmund Freud is famous for his theories of psychosexual development which suggest that people's personality traits stem from their libido (sexual appetite) which develops from early childhood experiences. Freud's trauma theory, originally named "seduction theory" posits that childhood amnesia was the result of the mind's attempt to repress memories of traumatic events (i.e. sexual abuse by caretakers) that occurred in the psychosexual development of every child. According to Freud, this led to the repression of the majority of memories from the first years of life when children were obsessed with exploring their sexuality. Freud moved away from this theory in the late 1800s. Freudian theory, including his explanation for childhood amnesia, has been criticized for extensive use of anecdotal evidence rather than scientific research, and his observations that allow for multiple interpretations.

While the Freudian psychosexual theory is debated, there are some insights to be made into the effect of childhood emotional abuse on memory. Examining the effects of emotional trauma and childhood amnesia shows that stressful experiences do in fact disrupt memory and can damage central parts of the memory system such as the hippocampus and amygdala. Adults who were abused or traumatized in childhood form their earliest memories about 2–3 years after the general population. In addition, they demonstrate considerable problems with visual, pictorial, and facial memory storage and retrieval compared to non-traumatized individuals. This implies that trauma can disrupt the formation of early childhood memories.

=== Emotion ===
The amygdala (which is primarily concerned with emotions and emotional content of memories) and the hippocampus (which concerns primarily autobiographical memories) are generally independent, but emotions and the amygdala are known to play a role in memory encoding, which is typically associated with the hippocampus. Research has found that later memories in childhood have more propositional and emotional content than earlier memories and are rated as more meaningful and vivid. It has been suggested that differences in the emotions experienced by infants and adults may be a cause of childhood amnesia. Whether highly emotional events can stimulate and improve reliable recall (flashbulb memories) is still highly debated.

Some studies have found that emotional experiences are connected with faster retrieval times, leading to the belief that emotional events have heightened accessibility in our memories. If an event is particularly surprising, it receives prioritized processing in the brain, most likely due to evolutionary reasons. The evolutionary psychology states that if a past event was particularly frightening or upsetting, one is apt to avoid a similar situation in the future, especially if it is endangering to one's well-being. In addition, the more significant an event, the bigger impact it has and the more rehearsal it receives.

Various findings have shown that events such as hospitalization and the birth of a sibling are correlated with an earlier offset of childhood amnesia, which may be because they were more emotionally memorable. Other seemingly emotional memories such as the death of a family member or having to move do not affect offset, possibly because the events were not as meaningful to the child. Some memories are therefore available from earlier in childhood than others, which has led to the conclusion that very emotional events can be encoded and recalled earlier than non-emotional events.

=== Neurology ===
One possible explanation for childhood amnesia is the lack of neurological development of the infant brain, preventing the creation of long term or autobiographical memories. The hippocampus and prefrontal cortex, two key structures in the neuroanatomy of memory, do not develop into mature structures until around the age of three or four. These structures are known to be associated with the formation of autobiographical memories. Specifically, the dentate gyrus, a section of the hippocampus, has been observed to primarily develop in the postnatal stages of development. It is theorized that this part of the hippocampus plays a large role in the ability to form and retrieve memories. The ability to store and recall memories gradually increases along with the postnatal development of the dentate gyrus.

The physiological approach appears to support findings of memory loss in relation to amnesiacs and others who have experienced damage to the hippocampus. They cannot efficiently store or recall memories from past events, but still exhibit perceptual and cognitive skills and can still learn new information. The development of the medial temporal lobe (MTL), which contains the hippocampus, has been found to specifically have a defining impact on the ability to encode and maintain memories from early childhood.

While the neurological explanation does account for blanks in very young children's memories, it does not give a full explanation for childhood amnesia because it does not account for the years after the age of four. Nor does it explain why children do not show childhood amnesia. Children around the age of two to three have been found to remember things that occurred when they were only one to two years old. This discovery that three-year-olds can retrieve memories from earlier in their life implies that all necessary neurological structures are in place to recall episodic information over the short-term, but evidently not over the long-term into adulthood. The finding that all altricial species experience profound forgetting of episodic information formed during infancy suggests that human-centric explanations of infantile amnesia are inherently incomplete. A comprehensive understanding of infantile amnesia will require a neurobiological explanation of why infants forget.

There are reasons to believe that different associations within the cerebral hemisphere have an effect on remembering events from a very early period in a person's life. Mixed-handedness and bilateral saccadic eye movements (as opposed to vertical or pursuit eye movements) have been associated with an earlier offset of childhood amnesia, leading to the conclusion that interactions between the two hemispheres correlate with increased memory for early childhood events.

=== Neurobiology ===
Research into the neural substrates of infantile amnesia using animal models has found that the major inhibitory neurotransmitter gamma-amino butyric acid (GABA) may be involved in the regulation of retrieval of infantile memories in adults. GABA activity is known to be higher in early childhood development than it is in adulthood, both in humans and other animals. Researchers have hypothesized that increased GABA activity in development has an effect on memory retrieval later in life. Past studies have shown that GABA aids in the forgetting of fear memories in infancy and that it may be a general mechanism for regulating infant memory retrieval. Benzodiazepines, a class of psychiatric medication which increase GABA expression, have been found to produce anterograde amnesia, or a failure to encode memories after taking the medication. Subjects taking benzodiazepines are found to perform worse on learning and memory tasks compared to drug-naïve subjects.

Previously, it was assumed that neurogenesis, or the continued production of neurons, ended after development. Recent findings have shown that there are high levels of neurogenesis in the hippocampus in early childhood which taper out into adulthood, although neurogenesis continues to persist slowly. As the hippocampus is known to be vital to memory processes, there are obvious implications for childhood amnesia. Animal research has shown that the age of high neurogenesis is in the developmental period when persistent memories are least likely to be formed. It has been proposed that hippocampal neurogenesis degrades existing memories. This may be due to increased competition between the new and existing neurons, followed by the replacement of synapses in preexisting memory circuits. This theory has been supported in mouse models in which increasing neurogenesis levels also increased forgetting. Additionally, decreasing neurogenesis after new memory formation resulted in decreased forgetting. It is unknown whether "lost" infant memories are permanently erased (i.e., storage failure) or become progressively inaccessible with time (i.e., retrieval failure). Consistent with a deficit in memory retrieval, optogenetic reactivation of neuronal ensembles that encoded the memory drive memory recall in adulthood. In addition, memories are consolidated via transferral from the hippocampus to the cortex. This transferral occurs preferably during periods of elevated excitability in the hippocampus i.e. during ripple oscillations. Ripple oscillations represent increased hippocampo-cortical communication. This increase in experience-associated activity does not occur up to a certain age suggesting that this might be a mechanism for infantile amnesia.

By stimulating neurons used in 'forgotten' fear conditioning in infant mice, Guskjolen et al. found retrieval of the fear response was possible by optogenetic reactivation of the neuronal ensembles that encoded the memory drive. This retrieval lasted for up to three months, suggesting the infantile amnesia was underlaid by a biological failure to access, rather than encode, said memories.

In addition, memories are consolidated via transferral from the hippocampus to the cortex. This transferral occurs preferably during periods of elevated activity in the hippocampus. This increase in experience-associated activity does not occur up to a certain age, suggesting that this inability to transfer information might be a mechanism for infantile amnesia.

=== Development ===
The development of a cognitive self is also thought by some to have a strong effect on encoding and storing early memories. As toddlers grow, a developing sense of the self begins to emerge as they realize that they are a person with unique and defining characteristics and have individual thoughts and feelings separate from others. As they gain a sense of the self, they can begin to organize autobiographical experiences and retain memories of past events. This is also known as the development of a theory of mind which refers to a child's acceptance that they have beliefs, knowledge, and thoughts that no one else has access to.

The developmental explanation asserts that young children have a good concept of semantic information but lack the retrieval processes necessary to link past and present episodic events to create an autobiographical self. Young children do not seem to have a sense of a continuous self over time until they develop awareness for themselves as an individual human being. Some research suggests this awareness is thought to form around the age of 4 or 5, as children in this time period can understand that recent past events affect the present, while 3-year-old children still seem unable to grasp this concept.

This acknowledged link of the past to the present and the concept of continuous-time and therefore a continuous self is also helped by memory talk with adults. Through elaboration and repetition of events experienced, adults help children to encode memories as a part of their personal past and it becomes essential to their being.

=== Language ===
The incomplete development of language in young children is thought to be a critical cause of childhood amnesia as infants do not yet have the language capacity necessary to encode autobiographical memories. The typical schedule of language development seems to support this theory . There appears to be a direct correlation between the development of language in children, and the earliest age at which they can obtain childhood memories (around the age 3–4). Performance on both verbal and nonverbal memory tasks shows that children with more advanced language abilities can report more during a verbal interview and exhibit superior nonverbal memory compared to children with less advanced language skills. If children lack language, they are unable to describe memories from infancy because they do not have the words and knowledge to explain them. Adults and children can often remember memories from around three or four years of age which is during a time of rapid language development. Before language develops, children often only hold preverbal memories and may use symbols to represent them. Therefore, once language develops, one can actively describe their memories with words. The context that one is in when they encode or retrieve memories is different for adults and infants because language is not present during infancy.

Language allows children to organize personal past and present experiences and share these memories with others. This exchange of dialogue makes children aware of their personal past and encourages them to think about their cognitive self and how past activities have affected them in the present. Several studies have shown that simply discussing events with children, in general, could lead to more easily retrievable memories. There has also been researching that suggests the degree to which a child discusses events with adults shapes autobiographical recollection. This has implications for gender and cultural differences. Autobiographical memory begins to emerge as parents engage in memory talk with their children and encourage them to think about why a certain event happened. Memory talk allows children to develop memory systems in order to categorize generic versus unique events.

The social-cultural developmental perspective states that both language and culture play a role in the development of a child's autobiographical memory. An important aspect of this theory considers the difference between parents who discuss memories at length with their children in an elaborative style, and those who do not. Children of parents who discuss memories with them in an elaborative style report a greater number of memories than children who do not discuss their memories. Memories are described in greater detail. This has implications for cultural differences.

== See also ==
- Cognitive psychology
- Developmental psychology
- Dissociative amnesia
- Neurobiology
- Prenatal and perinatal psychology
- Reminiscence bump
