= Wiley Interdisciplinary Reviews =

Wiley Interdisciplinary Reviews (abbreviated WIREs) is a set of peer-reviewed scientific journals that each publish interdisciplinary review articles on high-profile topics. The series was established in 2009 and is published by Wiley-Blackwell. Each journal publishes new review articles every month. The journal series won the 2009 R.R. Hawkins Award from the Association of American Publishers.

== Journals ==
- Wiley Interdisciplinary Reviews: Climate Change
- Wiley Interdisciplinary Reviews: Cognitive Science
- Wiley Interdisciplinary Reviews: Computational Molecular Science
- Wiley Interdisciplinary Reviews: Computational Statistics
- Wiley Interdisciplinary Reviews: Data Mining and Knowledge Discovery
- Wiley Interdisciplinary Reviews: Developmental Biology
- Wiley Interdisciplinary Reviews: Energy and Environment
- Wiley Interdisciplinary Reviews: Forensic Science
- Wiley Interdisciplinary Reviews: Membrane Transport and Signaling
- Wiley Interdisciplinary Reviews: Nanomedicine and Nanobiotechnology
- Wiley Interdisciplinary Reviews: RNA
- Wiley Interdisciplinary Reviews: Systems Biology and Medicine
- Wiley Interdisciplinary Reviews: Water
