= Wiley Interdisciplinary Reviews: Systems Biology and Medicine =

- Discipline: Systems biology, systems medicine
- Language: English
- Edited by: Joseph H. Nadeau, Shankar Subramaniam

Publication details
- History: 2009–present
- Publisher: John Wiley & Sons
- Frequency: Bimonthly
- Impact factor: 5.000 (2020)

Standard abbreviations
- ISO 4: Wiley Interdiscip. Rev. Syst. Biol. Med.

Indexing
- CODEN: WIRSBW
- ISSN: 1939-5094 (print); 1939-005X (web)
- LCCN: 2007216047
- OCLC no.: 1004973133

Links
- Journal homepage; Online access; Online archive

Wiley Interdisciplinary Reviews: Systems Biology and Medicine (abbreviated WIREs Systems Biology and Medicine) is a bimonthly peer-reviewed interdisciplinary scientific review journal covering systems biology and medicine. It was established in 2009 and is published by John Wiley & Sons as part of its Wiley Interdisciplinary Reviews journal series. The editors-in-chief are Joseph H. Nadeau (Pacific Northwest Research Institute) and Shankar Subramaniam (University of California, San Diego). According to the Journal Citation Reports, the journal has a 2020 impact factor of 5.000, ranking it 48th out of 140 journals in the category "Medicine, Research & Experimental".
