= The Gap (book) =

2013 nonfiction book by Thomas Suddendorf

The Gap: The Science of What Separates Us From Other Animals
- First edition
- Author: Thomas Suddendorf
- Language: English
- Genre: Non-fiction
- Publisher: Basic Books
- Publication date: 2013
- ISBN: 978-0-465-03014-9

The Gap is a 2013 nonfiction book by Thomas Suddendorf that discusses what cognitive qualities separate humans from other animals, and how they evolved.

The Gap: The Science of What Separates Us From Other Animals. Basic Books: New York ISBN 978-0-465-03014-9

== Reviews ==
- Anil Ananthaswamy (27 January 2014). What separates us from other animals? New Scientist
- Robyn Williams (March 2014). The science of what separates us from other animals. Australian Book Review
- Joseph Maldonado (2013). The Gap: The Science of What Separates Us from Other Animals. Psych Central. Retrieved on October 5, 2014, from http://psychcentral.com/lib/the-gap-the-science-of-what-separates-us-from-other-animals/00018372
- Steven Mithen (3 April 2013). Most of Us Are Part Neanderthal. The New York Review of Books
- Wray Herbert (10 February 2014). Social Animals - Pondering the limits of anthropomorphism. The Weekly Standard Vol. 19, No. 21. Retrieved on October 5, 2014, from
- David Barash (15 November 2013). Book Review: 'The Gap' by Thomas Suddendorf - What makes humans unique—tools? Language? Cooking?. The Wall Street Journal
- Nina Bai (17 October 2013). MIND Reviews: The Gap. Scientific American Mind volume 24 issue 5.
- Eric Michael Johnson (20 March 2014). The Gap: The Science of What Separates Us From Other Animals, by Thomas Suddendorf. The Times Higher Education.
- Staff writer (26 August 2013). The Gap: The Science of What Separates Us from Other Animals. Publishers Weekly.
- Tim Radford (7 November 2013). Human evolution: Us and them. Nature.
- Bryan Sim (16 May 2014). How great a separation? Science.
- Staff writer (12 November 2013). The Gap - The Science of What Separates Us From Other Animals. Kirkus Reviews
- Rob Brooks (3 June 2014). What makes us human? The Conversation.
