= Joseph W. Kable =

American psychologist

Joseph W. Kable is a psychologist at the University of Pennsylvania.

== Biography ==
Joseph Kable is the Baird Term Associate Professor of Psychology in the School of Arts and Sciences at the University of Pennsylvania.

Kable researches cognitive neuroscience. His work has suggested that an individual's approach to risk in decision making is correlated with the anatomical structure of the brain. Another of Kable's projects concluded that "Brain Training" using Lumosity software “appears to have no benefits in healthy young adults above those of standard video games.” Kable's team used functional magnetic resonance imaging (fMRI) to measure brain activation in the participants while they were performing executive function tasks. The measurements revealed no difference in brain activity between the Lumosity and control groups.

== Selected bibliography ==
- Jung, Wi Hoon; Lee, Sangil; Lerman, Caryn; Kable, Joseph W. (2018). "Amygdala Functional and Structural Connectivity Predicts Individual Risk Tolerance". Neuron. 98 (2): 394–404.e4. doi:10.1016/j.neuron.2018.03.019. ISSN 0896-6273. PMC 5910234. PMID 29628186.
- Kable, Joseph W.; Caulfield, M. Kathleen; Falcone, Mary; McConnell, Mairead; Bernardo, Leah; Parthasarathi, Trishala; Cooper, Nicole; Ashare, Rebecca; Audrain-McGovern, Janet; Hornik, Robert; Diefenbach, Paul; Lee, Frank J.; Lerman, Caryn (2017). "No Effect of Commercial Cognitive Training on Brain Activity, Choice Behavior, or Cognitive Performance". The Journal of Neuroscience. 37 (31): 7390–7402. doi:10.1523/JNEUROSCI.2832-16.2017. ISSN 0270-6474. PMC 5546110. PMID 28694338.
