= Reminiscence bump =

Memory phenomenon related to human aging

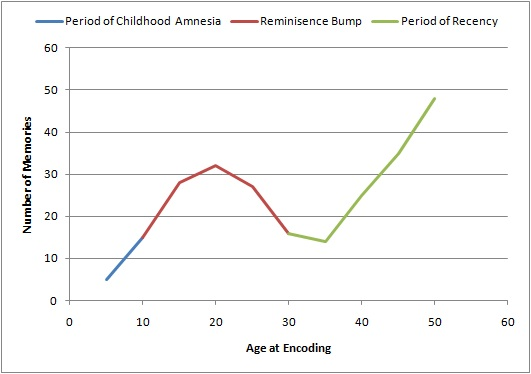
Lifespan retrieval curve

The reminiscence bump is the tendency for adults over forty to have increased or enhanced recollection for events that occurred during their adolescence and early adulthood. It was identified through the study of autobiographical memory and the subsequent plotting of the age of encoding of memories to form the lifespan retrieval curve.

The lifespan retrieval curve is a graph that represents the number of autobiographical memories encoded at various ages during the life span. The lifespan retrieval curve contains three different parts. From birth to five years old is a period of childhood amnesia, from 15 to 25 years old is the reminiscence bump and last is a period of forgetting from the end of the reminiscence bump to present time. The reminiscence bump has been observed on the lifespan retrieval curve in multiple studies. From 8 to 22 years old is the word-cued reminiscence bump and 15 to 27 years old is the important reminiscence bump.

Theorists have proposed several explanations, ranging from changes in brain biology to the type of events that typically occur during this time period. Researchers have consistently observed the reminiscence bump, the period of increased memory accessibility in participants' lifespan retrieval curves, and the bump has been reproduced under a range of study conditions.

== Theories ==
Adolescence and early adulthood have been described as important times in memory encoding because individuals typically recall a disproportionate number of autobiographical memories from those periods. The reminiscence bump accounts for this disproportionate number of memories. The reminiscence bump typically occurs between 10 years of age and 30 years of age and is the period that individuals produce the most memories during free recall tasks. Research suggests that memories are easily accessible from the reminiscence bump because they are linked to self-identity. The memories found within the reminiscence bump significantly contribute to an individual's life goals, self-theories, attitudes, and beliefs. Additionally, life events that occur during the period of the reminiscence bump, such as graduation, marriage, or the birth of a child, are often very novel, thus, making them more memorable.

There are three possible hypotheses of the reminiscence bump: a cognitive account, a narrative/identity account, and a biological/maturational account.

The cognitive account suggests that memories are remembered best because they occur during a period of rapid change followed by a period of relative stability. There is an assumed memory advantage for the novel and distinct events that is followed by a period of stability. The novel events are subject to greater elaborative cognitive processing leading to stronger encoding of these memories. Moreover, the period of stability that follows increases the stability of the cues for these memories and increases the chances of recall.

The narrative/identity account suggests that the reminiscence bump occurs because a sense of self-identity develops during adolescence and early adulthood. Research suggests that memories that have more influence and significance to one's self are more frequently rehearsed in defining one's identity, and are therefore better remembered later in life (Ece & Gulgoz, 2014). Self-identity formation provides added motivation for using cognitive processes to ensure recall of these memories. The events from this period are more likely to be organized into a story or view of oneself, and benefits from the advantage of schematic organization in memory.

The biological/maturational account suggests that genetic fitness is improved by having many memories that fall within the reminiscence bump. Cognitive capacities are at their optimum from the ages of 10 to 30 and the reminiscence bump may reflect a peak in cognitive performance. This account is therefore sometimes called the cognitive abilities account. Researchers have suggested that the increase of cognitive ability in early adulthood may cause memories during this time period to be more adequately stored (Ece & Gulgoz, 2014). The reminiscence bump is caused by age-related differences in encoding efficiency, which cause more memories to be stored in adolescence and early adulthood.

There is one additional theory that explains the occurrence of the reminiscence bump: the life script account. A life script refers to the series of culturally important transitional events that are expected to occur in a certain order at various points during the life span. During early adulthood one starts to make important decisions and have influencing experiences on his or her identity. The memories during this time period are therefore more significantly remembered because they are what has essentially determined and influenced their life script (Habernas & Bluck, 2000). A life script typically has the majority of expected transitional experiences occur during early adulthood (Gluck & Bluck, 2007), and usually includes positive experiences such as marriage, the birth of a baby, or buying a house. Events that deviate from the life script are typically sad and traumatic. These events, such as the death of a child, are not culturally expected and often do not show a peak of recall at any specific point during the life span. Life scripts act as a way to structure memory and lead to the expectation that the happiest and the most important life events form the reminiscence bump. Contrary to the recall of happy events, the recall of sad events remains stable across the life span and does not exhibit a bump in recall.

== Methodology ==
=== Galton cue-word technique ===
Used objects from his environment to cue memories from his life. Galton created lists of cue-words to stimulate memory recall. He recorded the amount of time required to recall an autobiographical memory related to the cue- word and note the distribution of memories over the life span.

=== Crovitz-Schiffman cue-word technique ===
Mimicked Galton's technique and had participants recall and date autobiographical memories in response to the cue- words. Participants were encouraged to share the first memory they thought of. This technique is consistent and reproducible under different conditions, such as using different participants or cue- words. There is a consistent peak of recalled memories within the reminiscence bump. However, different types of cue words, such as nouns and adjectives, elicited memories from different time periods and with different phenomenology.

=== Conway and Haque cue-word technique ===
These researchers presented cue-words in the form of common locations (restaurants, markets, parks), objects (chair, table, television), positive emotions (happy, joy, cheerful), negative emotions (frustration, pain, sad), and significant others (father, mother, friend). Participants were asked to retrieve a memory that reminded them of the cue- word, recall memories from across their lifespan, and recall memories that were at least a year old. Then participants were asked to date the memory to the nearest month and year. The results were graphed on a lifespan retrieval curve, and the reminiscence bump was observed.

=== Fluency tests ===
Have participants indicate important personal events on a timeline. Participants are given a timeline with intervals (e.g., 5 years per interval) and asked to fill in events that come to mind and indicate age during the event. This gives the participant the ability to recall freely rather than be limited to artificial cue- words. The time intervals focus the participant on certain periods and control the amount of time spent searching for memories.

Participants are given a time period and asked to recall as many personal events as possible from that period. It assesses the ability to generate both personal semantic and personal incident memories. Recalling the personal semantic memories, participants try to produce as many examples of names of people known to them in a 90-second period. This is repeated for three lifetime periods: childhood, early adulthood, and recent adult life. Recalling personal incident memories, participants try to produce as many personally experienced events as possible in a 90-second period, and it is also repeated for three lifetime periods.

=== Free recall method ===
Subjects share personal events and researchers compare involuntary and voluntary memories of young and older children. Participants read ten words and are asked to recall as many of the words as they can in no particular order. Then participants were asked to keep a diary on their memory process between two one-hour experimental sessions. They were asked to record autobiographical memories as soon as possible, using a two-page questionnaire for each memory. Allowed researchers to keep track of personal thoughts and events.

=== Twenty Statements Test (TST) ===
Participants provide 20 self-concepts that start with "I am..." This enables the collection of concepts and roles that are important to the definition of self. There is no unitary structure to self, it is a combination of self-schemata such as "I am a mother". These self-concepts, or self-images, are then used as autobiographical memory cues, enabling the distribution of highly self-relevant memories to be plotted across the lifespan.

=== Word-cued vs. Important memories ===
Subjects share personal events and researchers compare word-cued and important memories with the mean range of the bump located from 8.7 to 22.5 years of age for word-cued memories, versus 15.1 to 27.9 for important memories, likely due to childhood amnesia, which ends around the age of 8.

== Social and cultural influences ==
=== Literature, cinema, music and video games ===
The reminiscence bump can be observed in the distributions of people's favorite books, movies, records and video games.

=== Generation identity ===
Generation identity occurs when an individual recognises that they are part of a particular social subgroup, a cultural generation, and concern themselves with the internalization of external features of the world. The reminiscence bump occurs during a period of life where people form their individual and generational identity. The earlier years of the reminiscence bump coincide with the formation of generation identity, while the later years coincide with the formation of adult identity.

The influence of generation identity on the reminiscence bump can be attributed to the idea that all members of the subgroup are likely to have memories of similar types of experiences. Evidence attesting to the influence of generation identity on the reminiscence bump has been witnessed in populations that have experience with traumatic events. In 1999, researchers compared younger and older groups of Bangladeshis. The younger group (ages 20–42) showed the usual increase in memories during the reminiscence bump while the older group (ages 46–86) showed a second increase in memories between the ages of 35 and 55. The second bump experienced by the older group corresponded to the period of the Bangladesh Liberation War. The two generations showed similar patterns and timing of memory recall within their own subgroup, suggesting that they did have similar experiences, either living or not living through the war. This finding may suggests that each generation remember personal events and generational events.

=== Memory for public events and private events ===
Researchers have studied different types of memories in order to find some clues into how the reminiscence bump works and how memories are stored and retrieved. Participants were asked to retrieve memories that were classified as either public or private to try to find differences in terms of when these memories were stored. Public events are events that everyone living at the time know about and are exposed to (political, war/murder, sports/entertainment or news events), but private events are only experienced by the individual (relationships, births/deaths, work/education, home/leisure, illness and religion). When recalling public events, participants were between ages 10 and 19; and when recalling private events, participants were between 20 and 29. Researchers suggest that public events are recalled at an earlier age because individuals are gaining a sense of generational identity. People are starting to create their own beliefs and their individual identity, so these experiences are being rehearsed, practiced and stored in long-term memory. Private events are recalled later because this is when individuals are developing intimate relationship. Private events are more easily stored and recalled because they are unique to each person and are likely occurring without any outside influence.

=== Gender differences ===
Studies suggest gender differences in the reminiscence bump. Researchers found that men have more positive life events in their thirties and that women have more positive life events in their twenties. This finding suggests that the timing of important positive life events, such as marriage or employment, differ for men and women. Most of the major life events start between the age of 15 and 30 but there is a small gender difference shown here with respect to when the event takes place. Researchers found that women have a slightly earlier bump than men. The earlier age of the bump in women may be attributed to earlier hormonal changes in adolescence.

=== Cross-cultural studies ===
The reminiscence bump has been studied cross-culturally and has been observed in various cultural backgrounds and experiences. It is important to consider that the process of remembering occurs in the context of culture, and memories found within the reminiscence bump are congruent with the culture's goals, values, and belief systems. The age of occurrence of the reminiscence bump is culturally influenced and reflects the age at which a culture identifies individuals as adults. In Western societies the reminiscence bump corresponds with adolescence and early adulthood, approximately from the ages of 10 to 30. In Asian cultures the reminiscence bump appears later than in Western cultures because adulthood may not be reached until 30.

Culture not only influences the age at which the reminiscence bump appears but also the content of the memories found within the bump. Western cultures often value individuality, agency, and distinctiveness, where individuals are encouraged to develop and maintain their private beliefs, attitudes, and personality traits. Alternatively, Asian cultures often value group solidarity, communion, and interconnectedness, where individuals are encouraged to develop a sense of self that is aligned with social roles, duties, and responsibilities. The differences in societal norms expressed by Western and Asian cultures influence the focus of memories. Individuals from Western cultures have memories that cast the individual as the central character and often have self-focused autobiographical memories. Individuals from Asian cultures have memories that express a strong group orientation and often have relation-centered autobiographical memories.

A study done in 2005 showed more accurate age results that were dependent on culture and gender. American women and men showed reminiscence bumps at age 13 and 17, respectively, while Dutch participants show a more progressive development of encoding strength around age 15. Studies with an identical methodology found peaks in the same period with Polish and Japanese participants. Supporting this study, there was research done that compared the distribution of memories of participants from Bangladesh, China, England, Japan, and the United States. The research found a greater number of childhood memories among American participants than in other cultural groups. While the timing of the reminiscence bump is generally thought to be culturally universal, with some minor difference in the period of life from which memories are recalled, there are studies that offer support for the notion that similar life scripts, at least for positive events, might also be found across different cultures.

=== Age factor ===
Research suggests that people younger than 40 years also show a reminiscence bump. It was initially hidden because of the possibility of the recency effect. When researchers examined the encoding values, it showed a progressive increase with participant age around the reminiscence bump for participants older than 50. This proves that the reminiscence bump is stronger for older adults than younger adults.

These findings suggest that two processes affect the reminiscence bump phenomenon: (1) Events in adolescence are encoded more strongly than events that occur in other periods of life. (2) Because these events are initially stored more intensely, they will be retrieved more frequently.

=== Life scripts ===
A life script is a schema that outlines cultural appropriate events that individuals should experience during a specific time period. (Berntsen & Rubin, 2004). The life script account argues that the reminiscence bump occurs because individuals use life script memories to provide a basis of recalling important memories. The life script events often contain more memories during early adulthood, or the reminiscence bump, than any other age period (Berntsen & Rubin, 2004). The life script account emphasizes norms and expectations typical of a given culture with regard to the timing of major life events. The order and timing of the major events may differ depending on the culture. The life script is a representation of the sequence of normative and major life events. Individuals know the culturally shared expectations of the order and timing of life events in a prototypical life, and are also aware of their own timing in relations to those norms. It assumes that people have an internalized culturally-aware script of the events that make up an expected, skeletal life course; this script acts as a template for the recall of life events in association with each life phase.

A script has two parts: slots and requirements. In the life script, slots are culturally important transitional events that are expected to occur within a circumscribed age span in the life course of an individual; and, the requirement is the prescribed appropriate age for the culturally expected event that leads to causal sequencing, in a series of succeeding events.

The events in a life script are often positive, celebrated, and normative. It represents and idealized life story. An average life would also include negative events and people would learn from experience. But the life script is handed down from older generations, through stories, and observations of the behavior of others, typically older, people within the same culture. Individuals should also remember more during their young adulthood because that era is the time of biological maturation, new experiences, adult identity formation, and major events in life scripts.

Life scripts have the following ten properties:

(1) A life script is semantic knowledge about the expectations in a given culture about life events, not a form of episodic memory for those events.

(2) A life scripts is a series of temporally ordered events.

(3) A life script can be described in terms of slots and their requirements.

(4) Life scripts form a hierarchical arrangement, with transitional events forming a higher order "scene" in which a series of subordinate actions or episodes are nested.

(5) Life scripts are used to process stories—here, life stories.

(6) The slots and their requirements for life scripts are culturally important transitional events and their culturally sanctioned timing.

(7) Because life scripts represent a normative life course, life scripts are not extracted from personal actions in recurrent contexts but are transmitted by tradition. Young people who have lived through only a small part of their lives know the life script of their culture.

(8) Life scripts do not represent an average life but instead represent an idealized life, in that many common and important events are left out.

(9) Life scripts are distorted from actual lives to favor positive events.

(10) Life scripts are distorted from actual lives to favor events expected to occur in the period covered by the bump.

==== Results ====
Studies confirmed the hypothesis:

(1) a high overlap among the events generated by the participants, supporting the assumption of a shared cognitive structure

(2) a correlation between the order in which events were generated and their estimated dates, consistent with life scripts having a temporal structure

(3) a dominance of positive events, consistent with the assumption of an idealized version of life

(4) the age estimates for negative events had higher standard deviation than age estimates for positive and neutral events, consistent with the assumption that negative events have more poorly specified temporal slots than the positive events

(5) the frequency by which events were recorded was predicted strongly by valence and by whether the event fell during the period of the bump

(6) a dominance of culturally sanctioned transitional events, rather than purely biological events, consistent with the claim that mainly culturally sanctioned transitional events go into the life script

(7) the majority of positive events were estimated to occur between the ages of 15 and 30 years, whereas the life span for negative events was relatively flat.

==== Improvements ====
Modification of the cultural life script theory include: (1) the theory may benefit from explicitly distinguishing between specific transitional events and extended periods of stability (2) life script theory proposes that requests for negative events should rarely active the cultural life script, because negative events are often unexpected. Their study was based on the individual's unique chapters and specific memories, whereas the cultural life script is a de-personalized and culturally shared knowledge structure. Finally, the cultural life script theory seems unable to explain the reminiscence bump for public events.

== Personality ==
=== Dependence vs. independence ===
There is preferential access to memories of experiences that corresponds with an individual's sense of self especially in relation to the mechanisms critical to someone's sense of independence or dependence.

=== Power vs. intimacy ===
It has been identified that individuals with either a strong intimacy motivation or with a distinctive power motivation, and found that the intimacy-motivation group recalled peak experiences with a much higher percentage of intimacy themes, while the power-motivation group tended to recall peak experiences with strong themes of power and satisfaction.

=== Generativity ===
Generativity refers to nurturing and caring for those things, products, and people that have the potential to outlast the self. Individuals who were judged high in generativity, (i.e. who had a commitment story) were found to recall a higher proportion of events related to aspects of generativity. In contrast, those participants without a prominent disposition towards generativity showed no such bias.

=== Agentic vs. communion ===
Two groups of individuals were investigated, those concerned with personal power, achievement, and independence (agentic group) or those concerned with relationships, interdependence, and others (communion group). Agentic types consistently recalled emotional memories of events that involved issues of agency such as those involving mastery, dominance, and humiliation. In contrast, communal types showed a recollection bias for emotional memories featuring others, often significant others, in acts of love and friendship.

=== Memory for happy and sad events ===
Different emotions have been shown to affect memory. Life events that have stronger emotions attached will be remembered more vividly. In studies looking at emotional events and the reminiscence bump, older adults tend to remember more positive events than younger adults. Typically, during the reminiscence bump only happy memories and memories of important events are recalled. It is postulated that sad events are easier to forget because there may be an increased motivation to forget them. Conversely, individuals are more likely to recall and relive happy events because they produced pleasurable memories. A second explanation suggests that remembering positive events can help regulate emotions and even enhance moods. It is also possible to regulate emotions through remembering negative events and comparing these events to present positive events. Positive or negative events can also be used to share life experiences with others and compare life events.

== Flashbulb memory ==
Flashbulb memory occurs when a very vivid memory of a traumatic, emotional, or significant event is recalled. Researchers typically use public events such as the John F. Kennedy assassination and 9/11 as cues when studying flashbulb memories. Participants are asked to recall very specific information such as where they were, how they felt, and what they were doing when the event was taking place. Memories of these events are easily recalled and the individual believes their account of the event to be perfectly accurate.

These memories have been tested in different ways, including measuring the ability to recall details of the event and the impact of additional cues on the recall of the event. Denver, Lane and Cherry found that flashbulb memories that took place in the reminiscence bump were exceptionally vivid and easily accessible. It is suggested that the flashbulb memories encoded during the reminiscence bump are so vivid because the events happened during a time of identity formation and peak brain function. Additionally, these events are recalled well because they undergo more rehearsal due to their serious nature and frequent discussion.

== Brain damage ==
The impaired functioning of autobiographical memory due to damage or disease can have profound effects on an individual's episodic memory. This can skew an individual's lifespan retrieval curve and influence the presentation of the reminiscence bump. Memories an individual has for personal life events can show a different pattern than the average individual if they have brain damage caused by an event like an accident, a blow to the head or disease. For these individuals with brain damage, the lifespan retrieval curve can look different. An example of this is an individual having the reminiscence bump between the age of 5 and 13 rather than 10 to 30, which is the pattern for the average individual.

Brain injury in the frontal lobes can obscure memories and lead to the loss of details. In more extreme cases patients may even construct available autobiographical knowledge into plausible but false memories.

The effect of temporal lobe damage on the reminiscence bump is highly variable as a function of age at the time of injury. This is because patients with damage to the temporal lobes or underlying structures in the limbic system may lose the ability to form new memories, especially if the damage is within the hippocampal formation, while retaining access to at least some memories from before the injury. Individuals with this type of brain damage are not able to form new memories after the incident that caused the brain damage, but they still have access to memories that happened before the brain damage occurred. If the brain damage was present at the age of 10, the individual may not remember anything from between the age of 10 and 30 and have no reminiscence bump.

Those with damage to regions of the brain involved in visual processing, such as the occipital lobes, may develop amnesia. The episodic content of autobiographical memories is predominantly encoded in the form of visual images. If the ability to generate visual images is compromised or lost then access to specific details of the past held in episodic images is lost as well. When life events or episodic memories are encoded in the brain, they are in the form of pictures or visual images. They develop amnesia since they can no longer bring these visual images of the past to mind.

A common psychological phenomenon is the severe clouding of autobiographical memory, which results in the overgeneralization of memories. For instance, clinically depressed individuals, schizophrenic individuals, and those suffering from obsessive compulsive disorder tend to recall many memories that lack detail (clouded) and are much more schematic than typical autobiographical memories. In these instances, a patient asked to recall specific memories of his father could only recall general events such as "walks in the park after Sunday lunch" and was unable to generate a single specific memory of a single walk.

== See also ==
- Serial position effect
