= Episodic memory =

Memory of autobiographical events

Episodic memory is the memory of everyday events (such as times, location geography, associated emotions, and other contextual information) that can be explicitly stated or conjured. It is the collection of past personal experiences that occurred at particular times and places; for example, the party on one's 7th birthday. Along with semantic memory, it comprises the category of explicit memory, one of the two major divisions of long-term memory (the other being implicit memory).

The term "episodic memory" was coined by Endel Tulving in 1972, referring to the distinction between knowing and remembering: knowing is factual recollection (semantic) whereas remembering is a feeling that is located in the past (episodic).

One of the main components of episodic memory is the process of recollection, which elicits the retrieval of contextual information pertaining to a specific event or experience that has occurred. Tulving seminally defined three key properties of episodic memory recollection as:

- A subjective sense of time (or mental time travel)
- Connection to the self
- Autonoetic consciousness, a special kind of consciousness that accompanies the act of remembering, which enables an individual to be aware of the self in a subjective time

Aside from Tulving, others named additional aspects of recollection, including visual imagery, narrative structure, retrieval of semantic information and feelings of familiarity.

Events that are recorded into episodic memory may trigger episodic learning, i.e. a change in behavior that occurs as a result of an event, such as a fear of dogs after being bitten by a dog.

== Nine properties ==
There are essentially nine properties of episodic memory that collectively distinguish it from other types of memory. Other types of memory may exhibit a few of these properties, but only episodic memory has all nine:

1. Contain summary records of sensory-perceptual-conceptual-affective processing.
2. Retain patterns of activation/inhibition over long periods.
3. Often represented in the form of (visual) images.
4. They always have a perspective (field or observer).
5. Represent short time slices of experience.
6. They are represented on a temporal dimension roughly in order of occurrence.
7. They are subject to rapid forgetting.
8. They make autobiographical remembering specific.
9. They are recollectively experienced when accessed.

== Cognitive neuroscience ==
The formation of new episodic memories requires the medial temporal lobe, a structure that includes the hippocampus. Without the medial temporal lobe, one is able to form new procedural memories (such as playing the piano) but cannot remember the events during which they happened (See the hippocampus and memory).

The prefrontal cortex (and in particular the right hemisphere) is also involved in the formation of new episodic memories (also known as episodic encoding). Patients with damage to the prefrontal cortex can learn new information, but tend to do so in a disordered fashion. For example, they might show normal recognition of an object they had seen in the past, but fail to recollect when or where it had been viewed. Some researchers believe that the prefrontal cortex helps organize information for more efficient storage, drawing upon its role in executive function. Others believe that the prefrontal cortex underlies semantic strategies which enhance encoding, such as thinking about the meaning of the study material or rehearsing it in working memory.

Other work has shown that portions of the inferior parietal lobe play a role in episodic memory, potentially acting as an accumulator to support the subjective feeling that something is "old", or perhaps supporting mental imagery which allows you a sense of the vividness of memories. Indeed, bilateral damage to the inferior parietal lobe results in episodic memory that is largely intact, however it lacks details and lesion patients report low levels of confidence in their memories.

Researchers do not agree about how long episodic memories are stored in the hippocampus. Some researchers believe that episodic memories always rely on the hippocampus. Others believe the hippocampus only stores episodic memories for a short time, after which the memories are consolidated to the neocortex. The latter view is strengthened by recent evidence that neurogenesis in the adult hippocampus may ease the removal of old memories and increase the efficiency of forming new memories.

== Relationship to semantic memory ==
Endel Tulving originally described episodic memory as a record of a person's experience that held temporally dated information and spatio-temporal relations. A feature of episodic memory that Tulving later elaborates on is that it allows an agent to imagine traveling back in time. A current situation may cue retrieval of a previous episode, so that context that colours the previous episode is experienced at the immediate moment. The agent is provided with a means of associating previous feelings with current situations. Semantic memory, on the other hand, is a structured record of facts, concepts, and skills that we have acquired. Semantic information is derived from accumulated episodic memory. Episodic memory can be thought of as a "map" that ties together items in semantic memory. For example, all encounters with how a "dog" looks and sounds will make up the semantic representation of that word. All episodic memories concerning a dog will then reference this single semantic representation of "dog" and, likewise, all new experiences with the dog will modify the single semantic representation of that dog.

Together, semantic and episodic memory make up our declarative memory. They each represent different parts of context to form a complete picture. As such, something that affects episodic memory can also affect semantic memory. For example, anterograde amnesia, from damage of the medial temporal lobe, is an impairment of declarative memory that affects both episodic and semantic memory operations. Originally, Tulving proposed that episodic and semantic memory were separate systems that competed with each other in retrieval. However, this theory was rejected when Howard and Kahana completed experiments on latent semantic analysis (LSA) that supported the opposite. Instead of an increase in semantic similarity when there was a decrease in the strength of temporal associations, the two worked together so semantic cues on retrieval were strongest when episodic cues were strong as well.

== Age differences ==
Episodic memory emerges at approximately 3 to 4 years of age. Activation of specific brain areas (mostly the hippocampus) seems to be different between younger (aged 23–39) and older people (aged 67–80) upon episodic memory retrieval. Older people tend to activate both their left and right hippocampus, while younger people activate only the left one.

== Relationship to emotion ==
The relationship between emotion and memory is complex, but generally, emotion tends to increase the likelihood that an event will be remembered later and that it will be remembered vividly. Flashbulb memory is one example of this. Flashbulb memory is event-specific, which consists of depictions of personal experiences. For example, saying "I remember seeing Grandma smile when I gave her the present", or remembering the detailed events of the tragedy of 9/11. This idea of flashbulb memory was proposed by R. Brown and Kulik (1977), in which they stated that this idea revolves around remembering an event or unexpected circumstance due to emotional arousal. They referred to this memory as "photographic vividness". However, whether the vividness of the flashbulb memory is due to a virtual "flash" that occurs because of the emotional experience has been hotly contested. Flashbulb memories may occur because of our propensity to rehearse and retell those highly emotional events, which strengthens the memory. R. Brown and Kulik represented that these memories contain information that falls under the categories: place, ongoing activity, informant, own affect, and aftermath. Flashbulb memory is usually perceived as highly accurate and consistent over time and are presented with great confidence, even if sometimes they are inaccurate. Authors Brown, Kulik, and Conway argued that these special memories involve the limbic system, specifically, the amygdala. There is an abundancy of research that shows the amygdala involvement regarding retrieval of emotional memories, for example, research using brain imaging techniques.

== Pharmacological enhancement ==
In healthy adults, longterm visual episodic memory can be enhanced specifically through administration of the Acetylcholine esterase inhibitor Donepezil, whereas verbal episodic memory can be improved in persons with the val/val genotype of the val158met polymorphism through administration of the CNS penetrant specific catecholamine-O-methyltransferase inhibitor Tolcapone. Furthermore, episodic memory is enhanced through AZD3480, a selective agonist at the neuronal alpha4beta2 nicotinic receptor, which is developed by the company Targacept. Currently, there are several other products developed by several companies—including new catecholamine-O-methyltransferase inhibitors with fewer side effects—that aim for improving episodic memory. A recent placebo controlled study found that DHEA, which is a functional cortisol antagonist, improves episodic memory in healthy young men (Alhaj et al. 2006).

A 2015 meta-analysis of high quality evidence found that therapeutic doses of amphetamine and methylphenidate improve performance on working memory, episodic memory, and inhibitory control tests in normal healthy adults.

== Damage ==
- Based on a review of behavioral studies, it is suggested that there may be selective damage to the limbic-prefrontal episodic memory system in some autistic people. Another study exhibited evidence of autistic deficits in the episodic or self-conscious memory of personally experienced events.
- The label "amnesia" is most often given to patients with deficits in episodic memory.
- Alzheimer's disease tends to damage the entorhinal cortex and the hippocampus before other brain areas and this leads to episodic memory loss
- A rare type of shellfish poisoning called amnesic shellfish poisoning or "ASP" quite effectively and irreversibly damages the hippocampus, rendering one amnesic.
- Korsakoff's syndrome is caused by thiamine (vitamin B_{1}) deficiency, a form of malnutrition which can be precipitated by overconsumption of alcohol compared to foods.
- An acute cortisol level (by injection) has been found to significantly inhibit the recall of autobiographical memories which may contribute to memory deficits found in depression.
- The use of MDMA ("Ecstasy") has been associated with persistent deficits in episodic memory.

== In animals ==
Tulving (1983) proposed that to meet the criteria of episodic memory, evidence of conscious recollection must be provided. Demonstrating episodic memory in the absence of language, and thus in non-human animals, has been declared impossible as long as there are no agreed-upon non-linguistic behavioral indicators of conscious experience (Griffiths et al., 1999).

This idea was first challenged by Clayton and Dickinson in their work with the western scrub jay (Aphelocoma californica). They were able to demonstrate that these birds may possess an episodic-like memory system as they found that they remember where they cached different food types and discriminately recovered them depending on the perishability of the item and time that elapsed since caching. Thus, scrub-jays appear to remember the "what-where-and-when" of specific past caching events. The authors argued that such performance meets the behavioral criteria for episodic memory, but referred to the ability as "episodic-like" memory because the study did not address the phenomenological aspects of episodic memory.

According to a study conducted by the University of Edinburgh (2006), hummingbirds were the first animal to demonstrate two of the aspects of episodic memory—the ability to recall where certain flowers were located and how recently they were visited. Other studies have examined this type of memory in different animal species, such as dogs, rats, honey bees, and primates.

The ability of animals to encode and retrieve past experiences relies on the circuitry of the medial temporal lobe, a structure including the hippocampus. Animal lesion studies have provided significant findings related to the importance of particular brain structures in episodic-like memory. For example, hippocampal lesions have severely impacted all three components (what, where, and when) in animals, suggesting that the hippocampus is responsible for detecting novel events, stimuli, and places when forming new memories and retrieving that information later on.

Despite similar neural areas and evidence from experiments, some scholars remain cautious about comparisons to human episodic memory. Purported episodic-like memory often seems fixed to a particular domain or could be explained in terms of procedural or semantic memory. The problem may be better tractable by studying episodic memory's adaptive counterpart: the capacity to flexibly imagine future events. However, a recent experiment addressed one of Suddendorf and Busby (2003)'s specific criticisms (the Bischof-Köhler hypothesis, which states that nonhuman animals can only take actions based on immediate needs, as opposed to future needs). Correia and colleagues demonstrated that western scrub-jays can selectively cache different types of foods depending on which type of food they will desire at a future time, offering strong evidence against the Bischof-Köhler hypothesis by demonstrating that scrub-jays can flexibly adjust their behavior based on past experience of desiring a particular food. Similarities and differences between humans and other animals are currently much debated.

== Autobiographical memory ==
An autobiographical memory is a personal representation of general or specific events and personal facts. Additionally, it also refers to the memory of a person's history. An individual does not remember exactly everything that has happened in one's past. Memory is constructive, where previous experience affects how we remember events and what we end up recalling from memory. Similarly, autobiographical memory is constructive and reconstructed as an evolving process of history. A person's autobiographical memory is fairly reliable, although the reliability of autobiographical memories is questionable because of memory distortions.

Autobiographical memories can differ for special periods of life. For instance, people recall a few personal events from the first years of their lives. The loss of these first events is called childhood or infantile amnesia. Also, people tend to recall many personal events from adolescence and early adulthood. This effect is called the reminiscence bump. Additionally, people recall many personal events from their previous few years. For adolescents and young adults, the reminiscence bump and the recent events can coincide.

It is known that autobiographical memories initially are stored as episodic memories, but it is currently unknown if autobiographical memories are the same as episodic memories or if the autobiographical memories become converted to semantic memories with time.

== Types ==
- Specific events
  - When you first set foot in the ocean.
- General events
  - What it feels like stepping into the ocean in general. This is a memory of what a personal event is generally like. It might be based on the memories of having stepped in the ocean, many times during the years.
- Flashbulb memories
  - Flashbulb memories are critical autobiographical memories about a major event.

== Neural network models ==
Episodic memories can be stored in autoassociative neural networks (e.g., a Hopfield network) if the stored representation includes information on the spatiotemporal context in which an item was studied. Smaller memories such as words or references said by someone are labeled as inactive or active neurons in the entorhinal cortex.

Neural networks help us understand how the brain sends and receives different messages to the body, and how they are connected. These networks are a group of neurons or structures that are connected together. These structures work harmoniously to produce different cognitions within the brain. One of the largest proposals for this ideology is that of Diffusion Tensor Imaging. This technique traces the differing pathways of nerve fibres that further create communication throughout differing structures. These networks can be thought of as neural maps that can expand or contract according to the information being processed at that time. Neural Network Models can undergo learning patterns to use episodic memories to predict certain moments. Neural network models help the episodic memories by capturing the naturalistic state you are currently in such as scenery, rooms, time, smell, or even your current feeling.

== See also ==
- Bipolar disorder
- Borderline personality disorder
- Rapid cycling
