= Explicit memory =

Type of long-term human memory

Explicit memory (or declarative memory) is one of the two main types of long-term human memory, the other of which is implicit memory. Explicit memory is the conscious, intentional recollection of factual information, previous experiences, and concepts. This type of memory is dependent upon three processes: acquisition, consolidation, and retrieval.

Explicit memory can be divided into two categories: episodic memory, which stores specific personal experiences, and semantic memory, which stores factual information. Explicit memory requires gradual learning, with multiple presentations of a stimulus and response.

The type of knowledge that is stored in explicit memory is called declarative knowledge. Its counterpart, known as implicit memory, refers to memories acquired and used unconsciously, such as skills (e.g. knowing how to get dressed) or perceptions. Unlike explicit memory, implicit memory learns rapidly, even from a single stimulus, and it is influenced by other mental systems.

Sometimes a distinction is made between explicit memory and declarative memory. In such cases, explicit memory relates to any kind of conscious memory, and declarative memory relates to any kind of memory that can be described in words; however, if it is assumed that a memory cannot be described without being conscious and vice versa, then the two concepts are identical.

== Types ==
=== Episodic memory ===
Episodic memory consists of the storage and recollection of observational information attached to specific life-events. These can be memories that happened to the subject directly or just memories of events that happened around them. Episodic memory is what people generally think of when they talk about memory. Episodic memory allows for recalling various contextual and situational details of one's previous experiences.

Some examples of episodic memory include the memory of entering a specific classroom for the first time, the memory of storing your carry-on baggage while boarding a plane, headed to a specific destination on a specific day and time, the memory of being notified that one is being terminated from one's job, or the memory of notifying a subordinate that they are being terminated from their job. The retrieval of these episodic memories can be thought of as the action of mentally reliving in detail the past events that they concern. Episodic memory is believed to be the system that provides the basic support for semantic memory.

=== Semantic memory ===
Semantic memory refers to general world knowledge (facts, ideas, meaning and concepts) that can be articulated and is independent of personal experience. This includes world knowledge, object knowledge, language knowledge, and conceptual priming. Semantic memory is distinct from episodic memory, which is the memory of experiences and specific events that occur during people's lives, from which they can recreate at any given point. For instance, semantic memory might contain information about what a cat is, whereas episodic memory might contain a specific memory of petting a particular cat. Humans can learn about new concepts by applying their knowledge learned from things in the past.

Other examples of semantic memory include types of food, capital cities of a geographic region, facts about people, dates, and the lexicon of flowers; a language, such as a one's vocabulary or a person's final vocabulary both exemplify semantic memory.

=== Hybrid types ===
Autobiographical memory is a memory system consisting of episodes recollected from an individual's life, based on a combination of episodic (personal experiences and specific objects, people and events experienced at particular time and place) and semantic (general knowledge and facts about the world) memory.

Spatial memory is the part of memory responsible for recording information about one's environment and its spatial orientation. For example, a person's spatial memory is required in order to navigate around a familiar city, just as a rat's spatial memory is needed to learn the location of food at the end of a maze. It is often argued that in both humans and animals, spatial memories are summarized as a cognitive map. Spatial memory has representations within working, short-term and long-term memory. Research indicates that there are specific areas of the brain associated with spatial memory. Many methods are used for measuring spatial memory in children, adults, and animals.

=== Examples ===
Long-Term Memory	Subtype	Description	Example
Declarative (explicit)		Conscious memory of facts and events	
	Semantic	Factual information	The capital of Germany is Berlin
	Episodic	Specific personal experiences	Your 10th birthday
Non-declarative (implicit)		Modes of learning that are nonconscious - one learning to perform a sequence of actions that do not necessarily invoke knowledge	
	Priming	Also known as pattern completion, where one has the ability to complete a pattern they have once seen before. This priming differs from priming in Psychology.	If you were given a picture of half of a letter from the alphabet and you recognized which letter it is, you would be able to complete the letter.
	Perceptual learning	Perceptual ability to differentiate sensories through experience of stimuli	Differentiating between categories such as smells, colors, tastes
	Category learning	"...the process of establishing a memory trace that improves the efficiency of assigning novel objects to contrasting groups"	Movie genres, breeds of dogs, types of fruits
	Emotional learning	"...retention of classically conditioned emotional relationships that cannot be voluntarily recollected or reported"	Being afraid of dogs yet you cannot explain why
	Procedural learning	The formation of skills and habits	Learning how to ride a bike

== The model of language ==
Declarative and procedural memory fall into two categories of human language. Declarative memory system is used by the lexicon. Declarative memory stores all arbitrary, unique word-specific knowledge, including word meanings, word sounds, and abstract representations such as word category. In other words, declarative memory is where random bits and pieces of knowledge about language that are specific and unpredictable are stored. Declarative memory includes representations of simple words (e.g. cat), bound morphemes (morphemes that have to go together), irregular morphological forms, verb complements, and idioms (or non-compositional semantic units). Irregular morphological structures fall into the declarative system; the irregularities (such as went being the past form of go or idioms) are what we have to memorize.

Declarative memory supports a superposition associative memory, which allows for generalizations across representations. For example, the memorization of phonologically similar stem-irregular past tense pairs (e.g. spring-sprung, sing-sang) may allow for memory-based generalization to new irregularities, either from real words (bring-brought) or from novel ones (spring-sprung). This ability to generalize could underlie some degree of productivity within the memory system.

While declarative memory deals with irregularities of morphology, procedural memory uses regular phonology and regular morphology. Procedural memory system is used by grammar, where grammar is defined by the building of a rule governed structure. Language's ability to use grammar comes from procedural memory, making grammar like another procedure. It underlies the learning of new, and already learned, rule-based procedures that oversee the regularities of language, particularly those procedures related to combining items into complex structures that have precedence and hierarchical relations- precedence in the sense of left to right and hierarchical in the sense of top to bottom. Procedural memory builds rule-governed structure (merging or series) of forms and representations into complex structures such as:

1. Phonology
2. Inflectional and derivational morphology
3. Compositional semantics (the meaning of composition of words into complex structures)
4. Syntax

=== Broca and Wernicke's Brain Region ===
Broca's area is important to procedural memory, because, "Broca's area is involved in the expressive aspects of spoken and written language (production of sentences constrained by the rules of grammar and syntax)." Broca's area corresponds to parts of the inferior frontal gyrus, presumably Brodmann's area 44 and 45. Procedural memory is affected by Broca's aphasia. Agrammatism is apparent in Broca's aphasia patients, where a lack of fluency and omission of morphology and function words occur. While those with Broca's aphasia are still able to understand or comprehend speech, they have difficulty producing it. Speech production becomes more difficult when sentences are complex; for example, the passive voice is a grammatically complex structure that is harder for those with Broca's aphasia to comprehend. Wernicke's area is crucial for language development, focusing on the comprehension of speech, rather than speech production. Wernicke's aphasia affects declarative memory. Opposite of Broca's aphasia, paragrammatism is apparent, which causes normal or excessive fluency and use of inappropriate words (neologisms). Those with Wernicke's aphasia struggle to understand the meaning of words and may not recognize their mistakes in speech.

== History ==
The study of human memory stretches back over the last 2000 years. An early attempt to understand memory can be found in Aristotle's major treatise, On the Soul, in which he compares the human mind to a blank slate. He theorized that all humans are born free of any knowledge and are the sum of their experiences. It was only in the late 1800s, however, that a young German philosopher by the name of Herman Ebbinghaus developed the first scientific approach to studying memory. While some of his findings have endured and remain relevant to this day (Learning Curve), his greatest contribution to the field of memory research was demonstrating that memory can be studied scientifically. In 1972, Endel Tulving proposed the distinction between episodic and semantic memory. This was quickly adopted and is now widely accepted. Following this, in 1985, Daniel Schacter proposed a more general distinction between explicit (declarative) and implicit (procedural) memory.

With the recent advances in neuroimaging technology, there have been a multitude of findings linking specific brain areas to declarative memory. Despite those advances in cognitive psychology, there is still much to be discovered in terms of the operating mechanisms of declarative memory. It is unclear whether declarative memory is mediated by a particular memory system, or if it is more accurately classified as a type of knowledge. Also it is unknown how or why declarative memory evolved in the first place.

== Neuropsychology ==
=== Normal brain function ===
==== Hippocampus ====
Hippocampus as seen in red

Although many psychologists believe that the entire brain is involved with memory, the hippocampus, and surrounding structures appear to be most important in declarative memory specifically. The ability to retain and recall episodic memories is highly dependent on the hippocampus, whereas the formation of new declarative memories relies on both the hippocampus and the parahippocampus. Other studies have found that the parahippocampal cortices were related to superior recognition memory.

The Three Stage Model was developed by Eichenbaum, et al. (2001), and proposes that the hippocampus does three things with episodic memory:

1. Mediates the recording of episodic memories
2. Identifies common features between episodes
3. Links these common episodes in a memory space.

To support this model, a version of Piaget's Transitive Inference Task was used to show that the hippocampus is in fact used as the memory space.

When experiencing an event for the first time, a link is formed in the hippocampus allowing us to recall that event in the future. Separate links are also made for features related to that event. For example, when you meet someone new, a unique link is created for them. More links are then connected to that person's link so you can remember what colour their shirt was, what the weather was like when you met them, etc. Specific episodes are made easier to remember and recall by repeatedly exposing oneself to them (which strengthens the links in the memory space) allowing for faster retrieval when remembering.

Hippocampal cells (neurons) are activated depending on what information one is exposed to at that moment. Some cells are specific to spatial information, certain stimuli (smells, etc.), or behaviours as has been shown in a Radial Maze Task. It is therefore the hippocampus that allows us to recognize certain situations, environments, etc. as being either distinct or similar to others. However, the Three Stage Model does not incorporate the importance of other cortical structures in memory.

The anatomy of the hippocampus is largely conserved across mammals, and the role of these areas in declarative memory are conserved across species as well. The organization and neural pathways of the hippocampus are very similar in humans and other mammal species. In humans and other mammals, a cross-section of the hippocampus shows the dentate gyrus as well as the dense cell layers of the CA fields. The intrinsic connectivity of these areas are also conserved.

Results from an experiment by Davachi, Mitchell, and Wagner (2003) and subsequent research (Davachi, 2006) shows that activation in the hippocampus during encoding is related to a subject's ability to recall prior events or later relational memories. These tests did not differentiate between individual test items later seen and those forgotten.

==== Prefrontal cortex ====
The lateral Prefrontal cortex (PFC) is essential for remembering contextual details of an experience rather than for memory formation. The PFC is also more involved with episodic memory than semantic memory, although it does play a small role in semantics.

Using PET studies and word stimuli, Endel Tulving found that remembering is an automatic process. It is also well documented that a hemispheric asymmetry occurs in the PFC: When encoding memories, the Left Dorsolateral PFC (LPFC) is activated, and when retrieving memories, activation is seen in the Right Dorsolateral PFC (RPFC).

Studies have also shown that the PFC is extremely involved with autonoetic consciousness (See Tulving's theory). This is responsible for humans' recollective experiences and 'mental time travelling' abilities (characteristics of episodic memory).

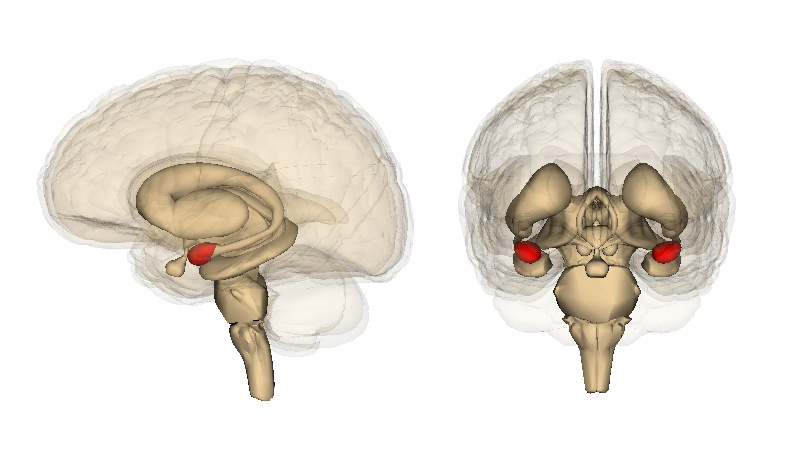
Amygdala as seen in red

==== Amygdala ====
The amygdala is believed to be involved in the encoding and retrieval of emotionally charged memories. Much of the evidence for this has come from research on a phenomenon known as flashbulb memories. These are instances in which memories of powerful emotional events are more highly detailed and enduring than regular memories (e.g. September 11 attacks, assassination of JFK). These memories have been linked to increased activation in the amygdala. Recent studies of patients with damage to the amygdala suggest that it is involved in memory for general knowledge, and not for specific information.

==== Other structures involved ====
The regions of the diencephalon have shown brain activation when a remote memory is being recovered and the occipital lobe, ventral temporal lobe, and fusiform gyrus all play a role in memory formation.

=== Lesion studies ===
Lesion studies are commonly used in cognitive neuroscience research. Lesions can occur naturally through trauma or disease, or they can be surgically induced by researchers. In the study of declarative memory, the hippocampus and the amygdala are two structures frequently examined using this technique.

==== Hippocampal lesion studies ====
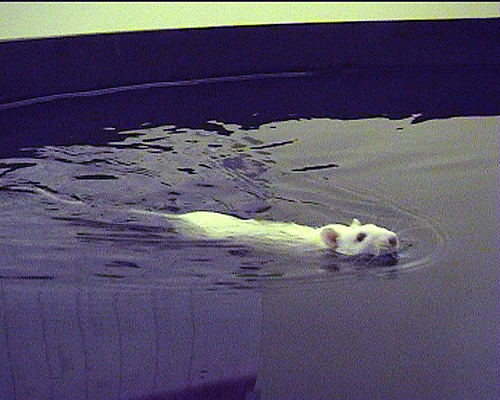
The Morris water maze

The Morris water navigation task tests spatial learning in rats. In this test rats learn to escape from a pool by swimming toward a platform submerged just below the surface of the water. Visual cues that surround the pool (e.g. a chair or window) help the rat to locate the platform on subsequent trials. The rats' use of specific events, cues, and places are all forms of declarative memory. Two groups of rats are observed: a control group with no lesions and an experimental group with hippocampal lesions. In this task created by Morris, rats are placed in the pool at the same position for 12 trials. Each trial is timed and the path taken by the rats is recorded. Rats with hippocampal lesions successfully learn to find the platform. If the starting point is moved, the rats with hippocampal lesions typically fail to locate the platform. The control rats, however, are able to find the platform using the cues acquired during the learning trials. This demonstrates the involvement of the hippocampus in declarative memory.

The Odor-odor Recognition Task, devised by Bunsey and Eichenbaum, involves a social encounter between two rats (a subject and a demonstrator). The demonstrator, after eating a specific type of food, interacts with the subject rat, who then smells the food odor on the other's breath. The experimenters then present the subject rat with a decision between two food options; the food previously eaten by the demonstrator, and a novel food. The researchers found that when there was no time delay, both control rats and rats with lesions chose the familiar food. After 24 hours, however, the rats with hippocampal lesions were just as likely to eat both types of food, while control rats chose the familiar food. This can be attributed to the inability to form episodic memories due to lesions in the hippocampus. The effects of this study can be observed in humans with amnesia, indicating the role of the hippocampus in developing episodic memories that can be generalized to similar situations.

Henry Molaison, previously known as H.M., had parts of both his left and right medial temporal lobes (hippocampi) removed which resulted in the loss of the ability to form new memories. The long-term declarative memory was crucially affected when the structures from the medial temporal lobe were removed, including the ability to form new semantic knowledge and memories. The dissociation in Molaison between the acquisition of declarative memory and other kinds of learning was seen initially in motor learning. Molaison's declarative memory was not functioning, as was seen when Molaison completed the task of repetition priming.

His performance does improve over trials, however, his scores were inferior to those of control participants. In the condition of Molaison the same results from this priming task are reflected when looking at the other basic memory functions like remembering, recall and recognizing. Lesions should not be interpreted as an all-or-nothing condition, in the case of Molaison not all memory and recognition is lost, although the declarative memory is severely damaged he still has a sense of self and memories that were developed before the lesion occurred.

Patient R.B. was another clinical case reinforcing the role of the hippocampus in declarative memory. After suffering an ischemic episode during a cardiac bypass operation, Patient R.B. awoke with a severe anterograde amnesic disorder. IQ and cognition were unaffected, but declarative memory deficits were observed (although not to the extent of that seen in Molaison). Upon death, an autopsy revealed that Patient R.B. had bilateral lesions of the CA1 cell region along the whole length of the hippocampus.

==== Amygdala lesion studies ====
Adolph, Cahill and Schul completed a study showing that emotional arousal facilitates the encoding of material into long term declarative memory. They selected two subjects with bilateral damage to the amygdala, as well as six control subjects and six subjects with brain damage. All subjects were shown a series of twelve slides accompanied by a narrative. The slides varied in the degree to which they evoked emotion – slides 1 through 4 and slides 9 through 12 contain non-emotional content. Slides 5 through 8 contain emotional material, and the seventh slide contained the most emotionally arousing image and description (a picture of surgically repaired legs of a car crash victim).

The emotionally arousing slide (slide 7) was remembered no better by the bilateral damage participants than any of the other slides. All other participants notably remembered the seventh slide the best and in most detail out of all the other slides. This shows that the amygdala is necessary to facilitate encoding of declarative knowledge regarding emotionally arousing stimuli, but is not required for encoding knowledge of emotionally neutral stimuli.

== Affecting factors ==
=== Stress ===
Stress may have an effect on the recall of declarative memories. Lupien, et al. completed a study that had 3 phases for participants to take part in. Phase 1 involved memorizing a series of words, phase 2 entailed either a stressful (public speaking) or non-stressful situation (an attention task), and phase 3 required participants to recall the words they learned in phase 1. There were signs of decreased declarative memory performance in the participants that had to complete the stressful situation after learning the words. Recall performance after the stressful situation was found to be worse overall than after the non-stressful situation. It was also found that performance differed based on whether the participant responded to the stressful situation with an increase in measured levels of salivary cortisol.

Posttraumatic stress disorder (PTSD) emerges after exposure to a traumatic event eliciting fear, horror or helplessness that involves bodily injury, the threat of injury, or death to one's self or another person. The chronic stress in PTSD contributes to an observed decrease in hippocampal volume and declarative memory deficits.

Stress can alter memory functions, reward, immune function, metabolism and susceptibility to different diseases. Disease risk is particularly pertinent to mental illnesses, whereby chronic or severe stress remains a common risk factor for several mental illnesses. One system suggests there are five types of stress labeled acute time-limited stressors, brief naturalistic stressors, stressful event sequences, chronic stressors, and distant stressors. An acute time-limited stressor involves a short-term challenge, while a brief natural stressor involves an event that is normal but nevertheless challenging. A stressful event sequence is a stressor that occurs, and then continues to yield stress into the immediate future. A chronic stressor involves exposure to a long-term stressor, and a distant stressor is a stressor that is not immediate.

==== Neurochemical factors of stress on the brain ====
Cortisol is the primary glucocorticoid in the human body. In the brain, it modulates the ability of the hippocampus and prefrontal cortex to process memories. Although the exact molecular mechanism of how glucocorticoids influence memory formation is unknown, the presence of glucocorticoid receptors in the hippocampus and prefrontal cortex tell us these structures are some of its many targets. It has been demonstrated that cortisone, a glucocorticoid, impaired blood flow in the right parahippocampal gyrus, left visual cortex and cerebellum.

A study by Damoiseaux et al. (2007) evaluated the effects of glucocorticoids on hippocampal and prefrontal cortex activation during declarative memory retrieval. They found that administration of hydrocortisone (name given to cortisol when it is used as a medication) to participants one hour before retrieval of information impairs free recall of words, yet when administered before or after learning they had no effect on recall. They also found that hydrocortisone decreases brain activity in the above-mentioned areas during declarative memory retrieval. Therefore, naturally occurring elevations of cortisol during periods of stress lead to impairment of declarative memory.

This study involved only male subjects, which may be significant as sex steroid hormones may have different effects in response to cortisol administration. Men and women also respond to emotional stimuli differently and this may affect cortisol levels. This was also the first Functional magnetic resonance imaging (fMRI) study done utilising glucocorticoids, therefore more research is necessary to further substantiate these findings.

== Consolidation during sleep ==
It is believed that sleep plays an active role in consolidation of declarative memory. Specifically, sleep's unique properties enhance memory consolidation, such as the reactivation of newly learned memories during sleep. For example, it has been suggested that the central mechanism for consolidation of declarative memory during sleep is the reactivation of hippocampal memory representations. This reactivation transfers information to neocortical networks where it is integrated into long-term representations. Studies on rats involving maze learning found that hippocampal neuronal assemblies that are used in the encoding of spatial information are reactivated in the same temporal order. Similarly, positron emission tomography (PET) has shown reactivation of the hippocampus in slow-wave sleep (SWS) after spatial learning. Together these studies show that newly learned memories are reactivated during sleep and through this process new memory traces are consolidated. In addition, researchers have identified three types of sleep (SWS, sleep spindle and REM) in which declarative memory is consolidated.

Slow-wave sleep, often referred to as deep sleep, plays the most important role in consolidation of declarative memory and there is a large amount of evidence to support this claim. One study found that the first 3.5 hours of sleep offer the greatest performance enhancement on memory recall tasks because the first couple of hours are dominated by SWS. Additional hours of sleep do not add to the initial level of performance. Thus this study suggests that full sleep may not be important for optimal performance of memory. Another study shows that people who experience SWS during the first half of their sleep cycle compared to subjects who did not, showed better recall of information. However this is not the case for subjects who were tested for the second half of their sleep cycle, as they experience less SWS.

Another key piece of evidence regarding SWS's involvement in declarative memory consolidation is a finding that people with pathological conditions of sleep, such as insomnia, exhibit both reduction in SWS and also have impaired consolidation of declarative memory during sleep. Another study found that middle aged people compared to young group had a worse retrieval of memories. This in turn indicated that SWS is associated with poor declarative memory consolidation but not with age itself.

Some researchers suggest that sleep spindle, a burst of brain activity occurring during stage 2 sleep, plays a role in boosting consolidation of declarative memories. Critics point out that spindle activity is positively correlated with intelligence. In contrast, Schabus and Gruber point out that sleep spindle activity only relates to performance on newly learned memories and not to absolute performance. This supports the hypothesis that sleep spindle helps to consolidate recent memory traces but not memory performance in general. The relationship between sleep spindles and declarative memory consolidation is not yet fully understood.

There is a relatively small body of evidence that supports the idea that REM sleep helps consolidate highly emotional declarative memories. For instance Wagner, et al. compared memory retention for emotional versus neutral text over two instances; early sleep that is dominated by SWS and late sleep that is dominated by REM phase. This study found that sleep improved memory retention of emotional text only during late sleep phase, which was primarily REM. Similarly, Hu & Stylos-Allen, et al. performed a study with emotional versus neutral pictures and concluded that REM sleep facilitates consolidation of emotional declarative memories.

The view that sleep plays an active role in declarative memory consolidation is not shared by all researchers. For instance Ellenbogen, et al. argue that sleep actively protects declarative memory from associative interference. Furthermore, Wixted believes that the sole role of sleep in declarative memory consolidation is nothing more but creating ideal conditions for memory consolidation. For example, when awake, people are bombarded with mental activity which interferes with effective consolidation. However, during sleep, when interference is minimal, memories can be consolidated without associative interference. More research is needed to make a definite statement whether sleep creates favourable conditions for consolidation or it actively enhances declarative memory consolidation.

== Encoding and retrieval ==
The encoding of explicit memory depends on conceptually driven, top-down processing, in which a subject reorganizes the data to store it. The subject makes associations with previously related stimuli or experiences. This was termed deep encoding by Fergus Craik and Robert Lockhart. This way a memory persists longer and will be remembered well. The later recall of information is thus greatly influenced by the way in which the information was originally processed.

The depth-of-processing effect is the improvement in subsequent recall of an object about which a person has given thought to its meaning or shape. Simply put: To create explicit memories, you have to do something with your experiences: think about them, talk about them, write them down, study them, etc. The more you do, the better you will remember. Testing of information while learning has also shown to improve encoding in explicit memory. If a student reads a text book and then tests themselves afterward, their semantic memory of what was read is improved. This study – test method improves encoding of information. This Phenomenon is referred to as the Testing Effect.

Retrieval: Because a person has played an active role in processing explicit information, the internal cues that were used in processing it can also be used to initiate spontaneous recall. When someone talks about an experience, the words they use will help when they try to remember this experience at a later date. The conditions in which information is memorized can affect recall. If a person has the same surroundings or cues when the original information is presented, they are more likely to remember it. This is referred to as encoding specificity and it also applies to explicit memory. In a study where subjects were asked to perform a cued recall task participants with a high working memory did better than participants with a low working memory when the conditions were maintained. When the conditions were changed for recall both groups dropped. The subjects with higher working memory declined more. This is thought to happen because matching environments activates areas of the brain known as the left inferior frontal gyrus and the hippocampus.

== Neural structures involved ==
Several neural structures are proposed to be involved in explicit memory. Most are in the medial temporal lobe or closely related to it, such as the amygdala, the hippocampus, the rhinal cortex in the temporal lobe, and the prefrontal cortex. Nuclei in the thalamus also are included, because many connections between the prefrontal cortex and temporal cortex are made through the thalamus. The regions that make up the explicit memory circuit receive input from the neocortex and from brainstem systems, including acetylcholine, serotonin, and noradrenaline systems.

== Traumatic brain injury ==
While the human brain is certainly regarded for its neuroplasticity, there is some evidence that shows traumatic brain injury (TBI) in young children can have negative effects on explicit memory. Researchers have looked at children with TBI in early childhood (i.e. infancy) and late childhood. Findings showed that children with severe TBI in late childhood experienced impaired explicit memory while still maintaining implicit memory formation. Researchers also found that children with severe TBI in early childhood had both increased chance of having both impaired explicit memory and implicit memory. While children with severe TBI are at risk for impaired explicit memory, the chances of impaired explicit memory in adults with severe TBI is much greater.

== Memory loss ==
Alzheimer's disease has a profound effect on explicit memory. Mild cognitive impairment is an early sign of Alzheimer's disease. People with memory conditions often receive cognitive training. When an fMRI was used to view brain activity after training, it found increased activation in various neural systems that are involved with explicit memory. People with Alzheimer's have problems learning new tasks. However, if the task is presented repeatedly they can learn and retain some new knowledge of the task. This effect is more apparent if the information is familiar. The person with Alzheimer's must also be guided through the task and prevented from making errors. Alzheimer's also has an effect on explicit spatial memory. This means that people with Alzheimer's have difficulty remembering where items are placed in unfamiliar environments. The hippocampus has been shown to become active in semantic and episodic memory.

The effects of Alzheimer's disease are seen in the episodic part of explicit memory. This can lead to problems with communication. A study was conducted where Alzheimer's patients were asked to name a variety of objects from different periods. The results shown that their ability to name the object depended on frequency of use of the item and when the item was first acquired. This effect on semantic memory also has an effect on music and tones. Alzheimer's patients have difficulty distinguishing between different melodies they have never heard before. People with Alzheimer's also have issues with picturing future events. This is due to a deficit in episodic future thinking. There are many other reasons why adults and others may begin to have memory loss.

== In popular culture ==
Amnesia is frequently portrayed in television and movies. Some of the better-known examples include:

In the romantic comedy 50 First Dates (2004), Adam Sandler plays veterinarian Henry Roth, who falls for Lucy Whitmore, played by Drew Barrymore. Having lost her short-term memory in a car crash, Lucy can only remember the current day's events until she falls asleep. When she wakes up the next morning, she has no recollection of the previous day's experiences. Those experiences would normally be transferred into declarative knowledge and allow them to be recalled in the future. The movie is not the most accurate representation of a true amnesic patient, but it is useful to inform viewers of the detrimental effects of amnesia.

Memento (2000) a film inspired by the case of Henry Molaison (H.M.). Guy Pearce plays a former insurance investigator suffering from severe anterograde amnesia, which was caused by a head injury. Unlike most other amnesiacs, Leonard retains his identity and the memories of events that occurred before the injury but has lost all ability to form new memories. That loss of ability indicates that the head injury affected the medial temporal lobe of the brain, which has resulted in his inability to form declarative memory.

Finding Nemo features a reef fish named Dory with an inability to develop declarative memory. That prevents her from learning or retaining any new information such as names or directions. The exact origin of Dory's impairment is not mentioned in the film, but her memory loss accurately portrays the difficulties facing amnesiacs.

== See also ==
- Gollin figure test
