= Margaret-Ellen Pipe =

Developmental psychologist

- Occupation: Professor of Psychology
- Awards: Honorary Doctorate, Stockholm University; American Professional Society on the Abuse of Children Outstanding Research Career Achievement Award

Academic background
- Education: University of Auckland
- Thesis: Hemispheric specialization for speech perception in retarded children (1982)

Academic work
- Institutions: College of Staten Island, CUNY; Brooklyn College, CUNY

Margaret-Ellen (Mel) Pipe is a developmental psychologist known for her research on memory development and its application to legal contexts involving eyewitness testimony of children in cases of child abuse. Prior to her retirement, she held the position of Associate Provost for Graduate Studies, Research, and Institutional Effectiveness at the College of Staten Island.

Pipe received the Mark Chaffin Outstanding Research Career Achievement Award from the American Professional Society on the Abuse of Children in 2014 and an honorary doctorate from Stockholm University in 2015.

Pipe is the co-editor (with Michael E. Lamb, Yael Orbach, and Ann-Christin Cederborg) of Child Sexual Abuse: Disclosure, Delay, and Denial.

== Biography ==
Pipe grew up in New Zealand and graduated from Waihi College. She received a B.A. degree in English at the University of Auckland, and continued on to complete a PhD in psychology in 1982. Her dissertation, titled "Hemispheric specialization for speech perception in retarded children" used dichotic listening to examine the right-ear advantage for processing speech in children with Down's syndrome or intellectual disability.

Pipe completed post-doctoral work in Psychology at Victoria University of Wellington before becoming a Senior Research Fellow and Staff Scientist at the University of Otago (1985-2001), where she worked with Harlene Hayne. Pipe was a professor and chair of the Department of Psychology at Brooklyn College prior to moving to the College of Staten Island in 2016.

Pipe and her colleagues have engaged in research on children's memory and testimony about witnessed events. Her team aimed to find out if specific techniques and object cues might help children produce more accurate descriptions of situations or events they may have experienced or witnessed. Supported by funding from the National Institute of Child Health and Human Development and the National Institute of Justice, Pipe worked as part of team that developed and evaluated a forensic interview protocol for interviewing children suspected of having witnessed or been a victim of child abuse. Their protocol used conversational methods to build rapport between the child and the interviewer and relied on open-ended questions as opposed to suggestive leading questions to elicit the child's recall of target events.
