= Remember versus know judgements =

Paradigm in the science of memory

There is evidence suggesting that different processes are involved in remembering something versus knowing whether it is familiar. It appears that "remembering" and "knowing" represent relatively different characteristics of memory as well as reflect different ways of using memory.

To remember is the conscious recollection of many vivid contextual details, such as "when" and "how" the information was learned. Remembering utilizes episodic memory and requires a deeper level of processing (e.g. undivided attention) than knowing. Errors in recollection may be due to source-monitoring errors that prevent an individual from remembering where exactly a piece of information was received. On the other hand, source monitoring may be very effective in aiding the retrieval of episodic memories. Remembering is a knowledge-based and conceptually-driven form of processing that can be influenced by many things. It is relevant to note that under this view both kinds of judgments are characteristics of individuals and thus any distinctions between the two are correlational, not causal, events.

To know is a feeling (unconscious) of familiarity. It is the sensation that the item has been seen before, but not being able to pin down the reason why. Knowing simply reflects the familiarity of an item without recollection. Knowing utilizes semantic memory that requires perceptually based, data-driven processing. Knowing is the result of shallow maintenance rehearsal that can be influenced by many of the same aspects as semantic memory.

Remember and know responses are quite often differentiated by their functional correlates in specific areas in the brain. For instance, during "remember" situations it is found that there is greater EEG activity than "knowing", specifically, due to an interaction between frontal and posterior regions of the brain. It is also found that the hippocampus is differently activated during recall of "remembered" (vs. familiar) stimuli. On the other hand, items that are only "known", or seem familiar, are associated with activity in the rhinal cortex.

== Origins ==
The remember-know paradigm began its journey in 1985 from the mind of Endel Tulving. He suggested that there are only two ways in which an individual can access their past. For instance, we can recall what we did last night by simply traveling back in time through memory and episodically imagining what we did (remember) or we can know something about our past such as a phone number, but have no specific memory of where the specific memory came from (know). Recollection is based on the episodic memory system, and familiarity is based on the semantic memory system. Tulving argued that the remember-know paradigm could be applied to all aspects of recollection.

In 1988 the application of the paradigm was refined to a set of instructions that could elicit reliable judgments from subjects that can be found using many variables. The remember-know paradigm has changed the way in which researchers can study memory tasks and has had implications on what were originally considered purely "episodic" memories, which can now be thought of as a combination of both remembering and knowing or episodic and semantic.

== Possible theories ==
Remembering and knowing have been linked to dual-component theories, as well as unitary trace-strength/signal detection models.

=== Tulving's theory ===
Episodic and semantic memory give rise to two different states of consciousness, autonoetic and noetic, which influence two kinds of subjective experience: remembering and knowing, respectively. Autonoetic consciousness refers to the ability of recovering the episode in which an item originally occurred. In noetic consciousness, an item is familiar but the episode in which it was first encountered is absent and cannot be recollected. Remembering involves retrieval from episodic memory and knowing involves retrieval from semantic memory.

In his SPI model, Tulving stated that encoding into episodic and semantic memory is serial, storage is parallel, and retrieval is independent. By this model, events are first encoded in semantic memory before being encoded in episodic memory; thus, both systems may have an influence on the recognition of the event.

=== High-threshold model ===
The original high-threshold model held that recognition is a probabilistic process. It is assumed that there is some probability that previously studied items will exceed a memory threshold. If an item exceeds the threshold then it is in a discrete memory state. If an item does not exceed the threshold then it is not remembered, but it may still be endorsed as old on the basis of a random guess. According to this model, a test item is either recognized (i.e., it falls above a threshold) or it is not (i.e., it falls below a threshold), with no degrees of recognition occurring between these extremes. Only target items can generate an above-threshold recognition response because only they appeared on the list. The lures, along with any targets that are forgotten, fall below threshold, which means that they generate no memory signal whatsoever. For these items, the participant has the option of declaring them to be new (as a conservative participant might do) or guessing that some of them are old (as a more liberal participant might do). False alarms in this model reflect memory-free guesses that are made to some of the lures. This simple and intuitively appealing model yields the once-widely-used correction for guessing formula, and it predicts a linear receiver operating characteristic (ROC). An ROC is simply a plot of the hit rate versus the false alarm rate for different levels of bias. A typical ROC is obtained by asking participants to supply confidence ratings for their recognition memory decisions. Several pairs of hit and false alarm rates can then be computed by accumulating ratings from different points on the confidence scale (beginning with the most confident responses). The high-threshold model of recognition memory predicts that a plot of the hit rate versus the false alarm rate (i.e., the ROC) will be linear it also predicts that the z-ROC will be curvilinear.

=== Dual-process accounts ===
The dual-process account states that recognition decisions are based on the processes of recollection and familiarity. Recollection is a conscious, effortful process in which specific details of the context in which an item was encountered are retrieved. Familiarity is a relatively fast, automatic process in which one gets the feeling the item has been encountered before, but the context in which it was encountered is not retrieved. According to this view, "remember" responses reflect recollections of past experiences and "know" responses are associated with recognition on the basis of familiarity.

=== Signal-detection theory ===
According to this theory, recognition decisions are based on the strength of a memory trace in reference to a certain decision threshold. A memory that exceeds this threshold is perceived as old, and trace that does not exceed the threshold is perceived as new. According to this theory, "remember" and "know" responses are products of different degrees of memory strength. There are two criteria on a decision axis; a point low on the axis is associated with a "know" decision, and a point high on the axis is associated with a "remember" decision. If memory strength is high, individuals make a "remember" response, and if memory strength is low, individuals make a "know" response.

Probably the strongest support for the use of signal detection theory in recognition memory came from the analysis of ROCs. An ROC is the function that relates the proportion of correct recognitions (hit rate) to the proportion of incorrect recognitions (false-alarm rate).

Signal-detection theory assumed a preeminent position in the field of recognition memory in large part because its predictions about the shape of the ROC were almost always shown to be more accurate than the predictions of the intuitively plausible high-threshold model. More specifically, the signal-detection model, which assumes that memory strength is a graded phenomenon (not a discrete, probabilistic phenomenon) predicts that the ROC will be curvilinear, and because every recognition memory ROC analyzed between 1958 and 1997 was curvilinear, the high-threshold model was abandoned in favor of signal-detection theory. Although signal-detection theory predicts a curvilinear ROC when the hit rate is plotted against the false alarm rate, it predicts a linear ROC when the hit and false alarm rates are converted to z scores (yielding a z-ROC).

“The predictive power of the signal detection modem seems to rely on know responses being related to transient feelings of familiarity without conscious recollection, rather than Tulving’s (1985) original definition of know awareness.

=== Dual-process signal-detection/high-threshold theory ===
The dual-process signal-detection/high-threshold theory tries to reconcile dual-process theory and signal-detection theory into one main theory. This theory states that recollection is governed by a threshold process, while familiarity is not. Recollection is a high-threshold process (i.e., recollection either occurs or does not occur), whereas familiarity is a continuous variable that is governed by an equal-variance detection model. On a recognition test, item recognition is based on recollection if the target item has exceeded threshold, producing an "old" response. If the target item does not reach threshold, the individual must make an item recognition decision based on familiarity. According to this theory, an individual makes a "remember" response when recollection has occurred. A know response is made when recollection has not occurred, and the individual must decide whether they recognize the target item solely on familiarity. Thus, in this model, the participant is thought to resort to familiarity as a backup process whenever recollection fails to occur.

=== Distinctiveness/fluency model ===
In the past, it was suggested that remembering is associated with conceptual processing and knowing is associated with perceptual processing. However, recent studies have reported that there are some conceptual factors that influence knowing and some perceptual factors that influence remembering. Findings suggest that regardless of perceptual or conceptual factors, distinctiveness of processing at encoding is what affects remembering, and fluency of processing is what affects knowing. Remembering is associated with distinctiveness because it is seen as an effortful, consciously controlled process. Knowing, on the other hand, depends on fluency as it is more automatic and reflexive and requires much less effort.

== Influences on remembering and knowing ==
=== Factors that influence remember responses but not know responses are ===
==== Frequency ====
Items of low-frequency are generally better recognized and receive more remember responses than high-frequency items. In a study, 96 words consisting of 48 low-frequency words and 48 high-frequency words were chosen by a psycholinguistic database. There were two alternate study lists, each consisting of 24 low-frequency words and 24 high-frequency words. Half of the subjects received one study list, while the other half of the participants received the other. The recognition test, which involved all 96 words, required participants to first acknowledge whether the target item was old or new; if the item was considered old, participants were further asked to distinguish whether the item was remembered (they could recollect the context in which it had been studied) or known (the item seemed familiar but they couldn't recollect contextual details). The results of this experiment were that low-frequency words received many more remember responses than high-frequency words. Since remember words are affected by distinctiveness, this makes sense; low-frequency words are experienced less than high-frequency words which makes them more distinctive. Also, there seemed to be no significant difference in the number of know responses made for low-frequency words and high-frequency words.

==== Generation effects ====
Items which are generated by a person receive more remember responses than items which are read, seen, or heard by a person. In addition, the generation of images to words enhances remember responses. In one study, all participants were asked to study a list of 24 common pairs of opposites, 12 had to be generated and 12 were read. The generated pairs required participants to generate them in the context of a given rule. The recognition test consisted of 48 words, 24 targets and 24 distractors. Participants were asked if items were old or new; if participants replied "old", they were then asked whether they remembered (could recollect contextual details of when it was studied) the pair or if they knew (recognized it but recollection was absent) the pair. Generation effects were seen in remember responses; items which were generated received more remember responses than read items. However, generation effects were not seen in know responses.

==== Divided attention ====
Remember responses depend on the amount of attention available during learning. Divided attention at learning has a negative impact on remember responses. A study was done which consisted of 72 target words which were divided into two study lists. Half of the participants were required to study the list in an undivided attention condition and half of the subjects studied the list in a divided attention condition. In the divided attention condition, subjects had to study the list while listening to and reporting high, low, or medium tone sequences. The recognition test consisted of participants deciding whether items were old or new; if items were deemed old, participants were then required to say whether items were remembered or known. It was found that the divided attention condition impaired the level of correct remember responses; however, the know responses seemed unaffected.

==== Depth of processing ====
When more detailed, elaborate encoding and associations are made, more remember responses are reported than know responses. The opposite occurs with shallow, surface encoding which results in fewer remember responses.

==== Serial position ====
The primacy effect is related to enhanced remembering. In a study, a free recall test was conducted on some lists of words and no test on other lists of words prior to a recognition test. They found that testing led to positive recency effects for remembered items; on the other hand, with no prior test, negative recency effects occurred for remembered items. Thus, both primary and recency effects can be seen in remember responses.

=== Factors that influence know responses but not remember responses are ===
==== Masked recognition priming ====
Masked recognition priming is a manipulation which is known to increase perceptual fluency. Since know responses increase with increased fluency of processing, masked recognition priming enhances know responses.

==== Repetition priming ====
Briefly presenting a prime prior to test causes an increase in fluency of processing and an associated increase in feeling of familiarity. Short duration primes tend to enhance know responses. In contrast to briefly presented primes, primes which are presented for long durations are said to disrupt processing fluency as the prime saturates the representation of the target word. Thus, longer duration primes tend to have a negative impact on know responses.

==== Stimulus modality ====
Know responses are enhanced when stimuli modality match during study and test; therefore, shifting the modality of a stimulus has been found to negatively impact know responses.

=== Factors that influence both remember and know responses are ===
==== Perceptual fluency tests ====
Knowing is influenced by the fluency in which an item is processed, regardless of whether information is conceptual or perceptual. Know responses are enhanced by manipulations which increase perceptual and conceptual fluency. For example, masked repetition priming, modality match during study and test, and the use of easy word-fragments in word-fragment recall are all perceptual manipulations which increase know responses. An example of a conceptual manipulation which enhances know responses is when a prime item is semantically related to a target item. Manipulations which increase processing fluency do not seem to affect remember responses.

==== Aging ====
Normal aging tends to disrupt remember responses to a greater extent than know responses. This decrease in remember responses is associated with poor encoding and frontal lobe dysfunction. It has been found that older individuals fail to use elaborative encoding in comparison to younger individuals. In addition to poor encoding, older individuals tend to have problems with retrieving information that is highly specific because they are less effective at controlling their retrieval processes. It is difficult for older individuals to constrain retrieval processes to the context of the specific item that is to be retrieved.

==== Word vs. non-word memory ====
When words are used as stimuli, more remember responses and fewer know responses are produced in comparison to when nonwords are used as stimuli.

==== Gradual vs. rapid presentation ====
Gradual presentation of stimuli causes an increase in familiarity and thus an increase in associated know responses; however, gradual presentation causes a decrease in remember responses.

=== Role of emotion ===
The amygdala plays an important role during encoding and retrieval of emotional information. It has been found that although negative and positive items are remembered or known to the same extent, the processes involved in remembering and knowing differs with emotional valence.

==== Remembering ====
Activity in the orbitofrontal and ventrolateral prefrontal cortex are associated with remembering for both positive and negative items. When it comes to remembering, it has been suggested that negative items may be remembered with more detail in comparison to positive or neutral items; support for this has been found in the temporo-occipital regions, which showed activity specific to negative items that were "remembered". A study found that in addition to being remembered in more detail, negative items also tended to be remembered for longer durations than positive items.

==== Knowing ====
Activity in the mid-cingulate gyrus, the inferior parietal lobe, and the superior frontal lobe are all associated with knowing for both positive and negative items. These regions are said to be involved in the retrieval of both semantic and episodic information. It has been suggested that the encoding of items which people forget details for or items which are forgotten as a whole are associated with these regions. This forgetting has to do with retrieval-related processes being active at the same time as encoding-related processes. Thus, the process of retrieval may come at the expense of encoding vivid details of the item.

In addition, disproportionate activity along the cingulate gyrus, within the parietal lobe, and in the prefrontal cortex is associated with the encoding of "known" positive items. This increased activity may cause the trade-off between retrieval-related processes and encoding-related processes to occur more significantly for positive items. This supports the idea that when people are in a positive mood, they have a more holistic, general thought process and disregard details.

=== Role of context ===
The functional account of remembering states that remember responses are determined by the context in which they're made; in general, recollection is based on the type of info that was encouraged by the deeper level processing task. Remember responses occur when retrieved information allow subjects to finish a memory test. The same item may elicit a remember response or a know response, depending on the context in which it is found.

In the expectancy heuristic, items that reach beyond a level of distinctiveness (the likelihood an item would later be recognized in a recognition test) elicit a remember response. Items that do not reach this level of distinctiveness elicit a know response. The level of distinctiveness is determined by the context in which items are studied and/or tested. In a given context, there is an expected level of distinctiveness; in contexts where subjects expect many distinct items, participants give fewer remember responses than when they expect few distinct items. Therefore, remember responses are affected by the expected strength of distinctiveness of items in a given context.

In addition, context can affect remember and know responses while not affecting recollection and familiarity processes. Remember and know responses are subjective decisions that can be affected by underlying memory processes. While changing recollection and familiarity processes can influence remember and know judgments, context can affect how items are weighted for remember-know decisions.

According to the distinctiveness-fluency model, items are seen as distinct when they exceed a level of memorability and items are seen as fluent when they do not reach this level but give a feeling of familiarity. Distinct items are usually unusual in comparison to the context in which they're found. Therefore, distinct items generally elicit a remember response, and fluent items elicit a know response.

== Testing methods and models ==
=== Judgments and retrieval of contextual details ===
In this study, the presence of source memory was utilized to estimate the extent to which episodic details were recalled; feelings of familiarity were accompanied by retrieval of partial contextual details, which are considered sufficient for an accurate source decision but not for a recollection response. Subjects that remembered the stimuli were able to differentiate the corresponding source correctly. The findings were consistent with the idea that "remember" responses, unlike "know" responses, are accompanied by memory for episodic detail, and that the loss of memory for episodic detail over time parallels the conversion of "remember" responses to "know" responses.

=== Yes/no recognition models ===
In the preceding task, participants are given a list of items to study in the primary learning phase. Subsequently, during the recognition stage, participants are asked to make a decision about whether presented test items existed in the previously studied list. If the participant responds "yes", they are asked why they recognized the specified item. From this, a conclusion was obtained based on whether the item was remembered or simply known.

=== Eye movement method ===
Primarily, experimenters recorded eye movements while participants studied a series of photos. Individuals were then involved in a recognition task in which their eye movements were recorded for the second time. From the previous tasks, it was discovered that eye fixations, maintaining a visual gaze on a single location, were more clustered for remembering rather than knowing tasks. This suggests that remembering is associated with encoding a specific salient component of an item whereas recognition is activated by an augmented memory for this part of the stimulus.

=== Decision processes in a remember and know model ===
In the above experiment, participants were presented with a list of 100 familiar words and were asked to read them aloud while simultaneously trying to remember each one. Subsequent to this, participants were asked to make a recognition decision based on the number of "yes" responses that were accompanied by some recollective experience. The results demonstrate the differing relationships between the "yes" and "no" conditions and "remember" and "know" memory performance. The outcome confirms that although familiarity and recollection may involve different processes, the remember/know exemplar does not probe them directly.

=== Remember-know models as decision strategies in two experimental paradigms ===
In the previous study, two different remember-know paradigms are explored. The first is the "remember-first method" in which a remember response is solicited prior to a know response for non-remembered items. Secondly, a trinary paradigm, in which a single response judges the "remember vs. know" and "new" alternatives is investigated. Participants are asked to subjectively decide whether their response within these studies is attributed to a recollection of specific details, "remembering", or familiarity "knowing". In the presently discussed experiment, "remember" and "know" responses generally depend on a single strength variable.

=== Multinomial memory model ===
Remembering (recollection) accesses memory for separate contextual details (e.g. screen location and font size); i.e. involves retrieval of a particular context configuration.

=== Signal detection model ===
This model uses the idea that remembering and knowing each represent different levels of confidence. In this sense remember/know judgments are viewed as quantitatively different judgments that vary along the same continuum. Subjects place their "know" and "remember" judgments on a continuum of strength. When people are very confident about recognizing an item, they assign it a "remember" response, and when they are less confident about a response it is labelled as a "know" response. A potential problem with this model is that it lacks explanatory power; it may be difficult to determine where the criteria should be placed on the continuum.

== Role in understanding psychological disorders ==
The remember-know paradigm has had great usage in clinical studies. Using this paradigm, researchers can look into the mechanisms of neuro-biological functions as well as social aspects of disorders and illnesses that plague humans. Recognition memory has been linked to advancements in the understanding of schizophrenia, epilepsy and even explaining simple autobiographical memory loss as we grow older.

=== Epilepsy ===
The remember-know paradigm has been used to settle the debate over whether the hippocampus plays a critical role in familiarity of objects. Studies of patients with epilepsy suggest that the hippocampus plays a critical role in the familiarity of objects. A study was conducted using the remember-know distinction to understand this idea of familiarity and whether it is in fact the hippocampus that plays this critical role. This study found that the hippocampus is essentially a system based on familiarity. The hippocampus actually suppresses any sort of arousal response that would normally occur if the stimuli were novel. It is almost as though familiarity is a qualitative characteristic just as is colour or loudness.

The remember-know paradigm with epilepsy patients to distinguish whether a stimulus (picture of a face) was familiar. Patients that were found to have right temporal lobe epilepsy showed relatively lower face recognition response than those with left temporal lobe epilepsy due to damage of secondary sensory regions (including fusiform gyrus) in the brain's right hemisphere, which is responsible for perception and encoding (esp. face memory).

=== Schizophrenia ===
A remember-know paradigm was used to test whether patients with schizophrenia would exhibit abnormalities in conscious recollection due to a deterioration of frontal memory processes that are involved in encoding/retrieval of memories as well as executive functions linked to reality monitoring and decision making. Using the "remember-know" paradigm, participants first identify stimuli that they previously studied. If an item is identified as a known stimulus, the participants are asked to distinguish whether they can remember aspects of the original presentation of the identified item (remember response) or whether they know that the item was on the study list, but have no episodic memory of specifically learning it.

Results showed that patients with schizophrenia exhibit a deficit in conscious recollection for auditory stimuli. These findings, when considered together with remember/know data collected from the same set of patients for olfactory and visual recognition memory, support proposals that the abnormalities in conscious recollection stem from a breakdown in central processes rather than domain-specific processes. This study depended greatly on the remember-know paradigm to test for conscious recollection differences in these patients.

=== Autobiographical memory loss ===
The remember-know paradigm has been used in studies that focus on the idea of a reminiscence bump and the age effects on autobiographical memory. Previous studies suggested old people had more "know" than "remember" and it was also found that younger individuals often excelled in the "remember" category but lacked in the "know".

A specific study used the remember-know paradigm while asking elderly people about their episodic memories from their university graduation. They were asked to determine whether their self reported memories were "remembered" or "known". It was hypothesized that reminiscence component of elderly adults' autobiographical recall would be strong for "remember" responses, but less so for "know" responses. It was also expected that recent memories would hold the opposite effect, that those individuals would be better at "know" responses than with "remember" responses.

Results showed that there was good retention after reminiscence bump and equal "remember" to "know" responses were reported. It was concluded that autobiographical memories were tied to both episodic and semantic memories. These results are important to demonstrate that aging is not accompanied by a decline in episodic memory due to a reliance on semantic memory as previously thought. The remember-know distinction was integral in achieving these results as well as understanding the ways in which autobiographical memory works and the prevalence of the reminiscence bump. The findings of Rybash are supported by other research.

== Related phenomena ==
=== Tip-of-the-tongue ===
The tip-of-the-tongue state is the phenomenon that occurs when people fail to recall information but still feel as if they are close to retrieving it from memory. In this sense an individual feels as if they "know" but cannot "remember" the actual information desired. It is a frustrating but common problem that typically occurs for individuals about once a week, is frequent among nouns and is typically resolved on its own. The occurrence of the tip-of-the-tongue state increases with age throughout adulthood. Such a feeling is indication that remembering will occur or is about to occur.

=== Knew-it-all-along effect ===
The knew-it-all-along effect is a variant of the hindsight bias. It is the tendency for people to misremember and think that they knew more in the past than they actually did. In such situations it is difficult for us to remember what it was like when we did not have an understanding of something. For example, one might have a hard time teaching a concept to another individual because they can not remember what it is like to not understand the material.

=== Hindsight bias ===
Hindsight bias is the phenomenon where people tend to view events as more predictable than they really are. This occurs because one's current knowledge influences the recollection of previous beliefs. In this phenomenon, what someone "knows" is affecting what they "remember". This inaccurate assessment of reality after it has occurred is also referred to as "creeping determinism". The hindsight bias has been found among a number of domains such as historical events, political elections and the outcome of sporting events. The hindsight bias is a common phenomenon that occurs regularly among individuals in everyday life and can be generated in a laboratory setting to help increase the understanding of memory and specifically memory distortions.
