= Associative interference =

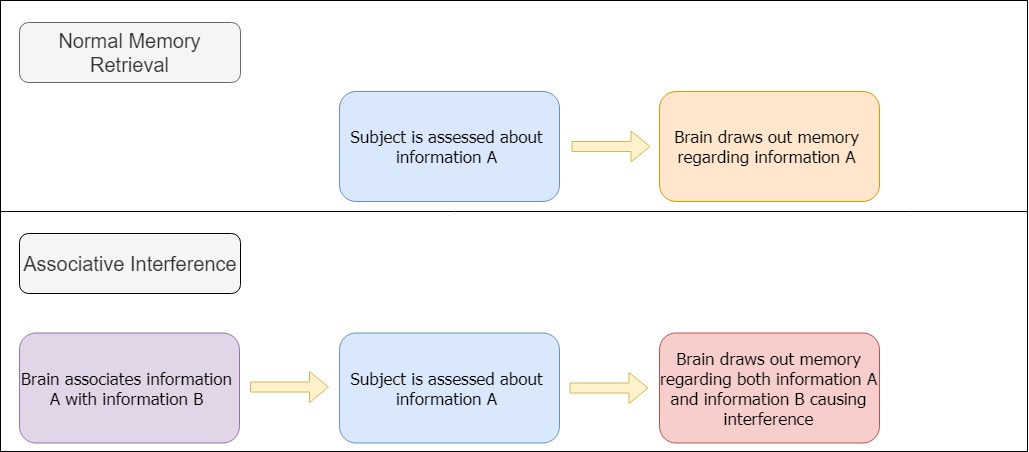
Diagram explaining how associative interference is caused

Associative interference is a cognitive theory established on the concept of associative learning, which suggests that the brain links related elements. When one element is stimulated, its associates can also be activated. The most known study demonstrating the credibility of this concept was Pavlov's experiment in 1927 which was later developed into the learning procedure known as classical conditioning.

However, whilst classical conditioning and associative learning both explore how the brain utilizes this cognitive association to benefit us, studies have also shown how the brain can mistakenly associate related, but incorrect elements together, and this is known as associative interference. A simple example of this would be when one was asked a series of multiplication questions. A study conducted in 1985 showed that over 90% of the mistakes subjects made were actually answers to other questions with a common multiplicand. That is, questions such as 4 x 6 = 24 and 3 x 8 = 24 were very likely to promote errors (8 x 4 = 24) due to associative interference.

Associative interference was widely investigated and researchers realized there were different types of interference, namely retroactive interference which investigates how new memories disrupts the retrieval of old memories, and proactive interference which investigates how old memories disrupts the retrieval of new memories. These two were subsequently known as the interference theory.

Therefore, associative interference is a fundamental theory which the interference theory draws upon. The essential difference between these two is time. Both retroactive and proactive interference are concerned with when the interfering elements, or memories were obtained. However, associative interference does not encompass time, as shown by the previous example. The chronological acquisition of the four times table in relation to the three times table is independent as to why subjects made an error, highlighting the difference between the two.

== History ==
Interference in experimental literature has been a topic of interest for psychologists for over 100 years, with early studies dating back to the 1890s. Hugo Münsterberg was among the first to study this concept by recording the effects of altering some of his daily routines, such as dipping his pen in ink and taking a watch out of his pocket. He concluded that by associating the stimulus (what's the time?) with a response (taking out pocket watch), both the stimulus and response have equal likelihood to trigger automatic retrieval if the other was encountered. That is, taking out a pocket watch (response) would often trigger the action of checking the time (stimulus) even if the supposed action was something different, such as taking out the watch and placing it on the table.

Georg E. Müller and Friedrich Schumann later developed a study in 1894 researching stimuli recall. By making subjects learn a series of words composed of nonsense syllables, it was found that if an association formed between syllables 1 and 2, it was harder for subjects to associate syllable 1 with syllable 3. The phenomenon was subsequently termed the law of associative inhibition. This paved the way for future studies as many psychologists utilized a similar experimental procedure of preparing a series of stimuli for subjects to recognize and/or recall to investigate the effects of interference.

Over the course of the 19th and 20th century, various psychologists entered the field of interference study and designed their experiments with unique stimuli. John A. Bergström and many others began working with card sorting, while Linus W. Kline used stimuli which were designed to be more recognizable for subjects such as states, capitals and book titles. In the end, it was concluded that as long as the subject's brain had formed associations with the experiment stimuli, regardless of what form or shape the stimuli took interference could occur.

== Impact on memory ==
=== Effect on recall ===
Many studies have concluded that associative interference reduces a subject's ability to recall. In 1925, Erwin A. Esper presented subjects with a series of random shapes with different colours. In total there were 4 different shapes and colours, creating 16 possible shape-colour combinations.

Each combination was then assigned a nonsensical name which followed the same rule. The first half of the name would be a syllable corresponding to its colour, whilst the second half would be a syllable corresponding to its shape. For example, the colour red would correspond to the syllable “nas”, whilst the first shape would correspond to the syllable “lin”, creating the name “naslin” for that specific combination. By presenting these combinations alongside their names to subjects to remember throughout the length of the study, they were subsequently tested by being asked to recall the name of each randomly presented combination.

The results of this study found that in cases where subjects made a mistake, a common pattern emerged. Using the previous colour-shape combination as an example, when it was presented one participant's response was “nasden”. This response seemed to be an amalgamation of “naslin” the correct answer, and the word “nasdeg” which interestingly was a name assigned to another colour-shape combination with a different shape, but also in red. This occurrence whereby the stimulus and its similar associate forms a variant were seen for other combinations as well and indicates the presence of associative interference.

Similar trends can be seen in other studies. Alison M. Dyne and her peers designed a similar experiment, however instead of colours and shapes, word pairs were used to investigate whether overlapping words from different pairs would result in associative interference during recall.

Participants were introduced to a study list with word pairs randomly sampled from a word pool which they were subsequently tested on. The pairs that were chosen consisted of a mix of ones which had unique words (where both words did not appear in any other pair on the list), and ones which had overlapping words (where one or both words appeared in other pairs on the list). They were then given one half of the word-pair, and asked to recall and write down the corresponding word for that specific pair. As hypothesised, associative interference hindered many of the participants recall ability, as they were much more likely to make a mistake in recalling overlapping word pairs.

=== Effect on recognition ===
Whilst associative interference has shown to reduce recall performance, its effects on recognition remain inconsistent.

In the previous study, participants were also tested for recognition, by providing a similar test list with interference inducing word pairs and non-interference word pairs. However, this time certain pairs from both categories were rearranged, and participants were asked to circle the pairs they thought remained the same. Surprisingly, there was no significant result to indicate the sign of associative interference as both the miss rate and accuracy rate increased under interference conditions as opposed to the recall experiment.

Michael F. Verde conducted a similar study in 2004 to further investigate how recognition is affected by interference. In his experimental method, participants were also subject to word pairs, however this time in the form of “the person is in the location”. Participants were tested in a similar manner to the previous study by being asked if the tested pair were rearranged or not. After noting the lack of any significant results to Dyne and her peers' study, Verde then introduced a new factor, the concept of familiarity. Despite the results of the recognition test not showing signs of interference, he predicted that interference conditions would increase participant's familiarity to the word pairs.

As such, a second experiment was conducted whose method was almost identical to the first. However this time instead of presenting participants with some word pairs which were rearranged, word pairs which contained words not present in the study list were added to the test list. Participants were then asked if the tested word pairs contained novel words which they hadn't seen before to investigate how familiarity affects recognition under interference and non-interference conditions. This resulted in an increase in recognition rate under interference conditions compared to the first experiment, suggesting that familiarity is a contributor to recognition performance while under the influence of associative interference.

== Impact on learning ==
Kevin Darby and Vladimir Sloutsky's study of interference effects on memory development has shown that associative interference can have significant implications on learning as a result of its effects on memory (ref). In their study, 2 experimental studies were outlined to test the ways in which interference impacts learning.

The first one was conducted on a sample of preschool-aged participants. The stimulus presented were word pairs from 4 different categories: animals (e.g. turtle), vehicles (e.g. train), clothing (e.g. boot) and furniture (e.g. lamp) presented in a visual form. No pair contained words from the same category, and these image pairs where shown to participants alongside 2 familiar characters; Winnie the Pooh and Mickey Mouse. These two characters served as a response to test interference, as each word pair would correspond to one of the characters. Similar to prior interference studies, word pairs were either unique, or contained an overlapping word from another pair. These overlapping pairs were used to facilitate interference conditions.

After an initial phase of teaching participants what each word pair's supposed response was, they then undergone a testing phase and questioned on the proper response for each pair. The results of this experiment revealed that the young participants showed signs of interference. However, these results are all expected, and align with similar conclusions achieved from previous studies. The unique factor regarding Darby and Sloutsky's experiment was that it was repeated, this time with adult participants. Although both younger and older participants have displayed signs of interference, by directly comparing the two age groups it becomes possible to analyse the level of impact interference has with regards to age.

These subsequent experiments with adult participants concluded that certain types of interference affected children much more than adults. Therefore, it can be concluded that interference has a much bigger impact on learning during childhood and growing up than it is when an individual is much older.

Although this difference isn't substantial to the point where adults can learn more easily than children as shown by multiple studies as a result of neuroplasticity, it is important to outline the importance of interference as a hindrance towards learning in younger individuals. In particular, education systems such as schools may need to reassess certain topics and subjects if they are more difficult for students to grasp as interference may be inhibiting their ability to understand and process the information to learn and memorise it.

== Proactive Interference and Retroactive interference Summary ==
=== Context ===
The concepts of proactive interference and retroactive interference were first introduced by the studies of verbal behavior, focusing on the use of paired-associate learning, in which a stimulus is paired with an idea or object that elicits a response. In order to observe interference using paired-associate stimuli, the target association should be similar, to some extent, to the interfering association, otherwise interference would not occur. For example, if subjects are asked to memorize word pairs (e.g., donkey-tree and dog-tree), interference will occur when two pairs share a common associate (in this example, tree). A study using paired-associate tasks by Wickens, Born, and Allen (1963) showed that if target material and interfering material decrease in similarity, a decrease in proactive interference will follow.

Proactive interference is the interfering of older memories with the retrieval of newer memories. Compared with retroactive interference, it is less common and less problematic. Proactive interference is likely to happen when memories are learned in similar contexts. An example is when motor abilities from skills that were previously learned interfere with new abilities in another skill being learned. If someone learned how to drive a stick shift first, and has driven a stick shift for a long time, it would be harder for them to drive an automatic car. interference is also associated with poorer list discrimination, which occurs when participants are asked to judge whether an item has appeared on a previously learned list. If the items or pairs to be learned are conceptually related to one another, then proactive interference has a greater effect. Delos Wickens discovered that proactive interference build-up is released when there is a change to the category of items being learned, leading to increased processing in working memory. Presenting new skills later in practice can considerably reduce proactive interference, which is desirable for participants to have the best opportunity to encode fresh new memories into long-term memory."

Retroactive interference is the interference of newer memories with the retrieval of older memories. The learning of new memories contributes to the forgetting of previously learned memories. For example, retroactive interference would happen as an individual learns a list of Italian vocabulary words, had previously learned Spanish. Learning the Italian words would make it more difficult to remember the Spanish words. The term Retroactive Interference was first brought up by Muller and colleagues; they demonstrated that if the retention interval (the amount of time between stimulus presentation and recall) was filled with tasks and material, interference would be caused with the previously learned items. Retroactive interference may have larger effects than proactive interference because it not only involves competition between previously learned material and new material, but it also involves unlearning.

=== Paired-associate learning ===
One strategy used to understand how people encode and retrieve memory associations is called paired-associate learning. In a typical study using paired-associate learning, subjects would be presented with pairs of unrelated words (cat, phone) and then memory for those word pairs would be tested. Results from Rohwer’s (1966) studies on paired-associate learning indicate that subjects have increased recall ability when words are associated with a specific context than without such context. For example, subjects would perform better in a recalling task if the sentence “The COW chased the BALL” than if they simply tried to remember the words cow and ball., which seems to support the claim that elaborative rehearsal can improve memory. Other research by Bobrow and Bower (1969) indicated that subject-generated sentences were better recalled than experimenter-generated sentences, suggesting that self-generated sentences improved word pair recall. Bower (1969) also suggested that if experimenters try to control subject's spontaneous elaboration in the control group by telling them to repeat the words over and over (without making any elaborative rehearsal), recall would be negatively affected.
