= Memory development =

Development of memory in children

The development of memory is a lifelong process that continues through adulthood. Development etymologically refers to a progressive unfolding. Memory development tends to focus on periods of infancy, toddlers, children, and adolescents, yet the developmental progression of memory in adults and older adults is also circumscribed under the umbrella of memory development.

The development of memory in children becomes evident within the first 3 years of a child's life as they show considerable advances in declarative memory, a child's memory throughout their development. This enhancement continues into adolescence with major developments in short term memory, working memory, long term memory and autobiographical memory.

The development of memory in adults, especially older adults, is often seen more negatively. Most adults will face symptoms of memory loss in both their short- and long-term memory; Alzheimer's is a prime example of this.

Recent research on the development of memory has indicated that declarative, or explicit memory, may exist in infants who are even younger than two years old. For example, newborns who are less than 3 days old demonstrate a preference for their mother's own voice, demonstrating the significance of a strong and powerful connection to the mother.

== Cognitive neuroscience of memory development ==
Declarative memory develops very rapidly throughout the first 2 years of life; infants of this age show evidence of cognitive development in many ways (e.g., increased attention, language acquisition, increasing knowledge). There is a difference in the brain development of explicit and implicit memory in infants. Implicit memory is controlled by an early-developing memory system in the brain that is present very early on, and can be explained by the early maturation of striatum, cerebellum, and brain stem, which are all involved in implicit learning and memory.

Development of explicit memory depends on a later developing memory system in the brain that reaches maturity between 8 and 10 months of age. Explicit memory depends heavily on structures in the medial temporal lobe, including the hippocampus and the parahippocampal cortex. Much of the brain system is formed before birth, however the dentate gyrus within the hippocampal formation has about 70% of the number of cells in adults.

Rapid myelination of axons within the central nervous system occurs during first year of life which can dramatically increase the efficiency and speed of transmission in neurons. This can explain the higher processing speed of older infants as compared to younger ones.

== Principles of neuroplasticity ==
Neuroplasticity describes the process of the structural and functional changes in the brain. It is defined as "the ability of the nervous system to change its activity in response to intrinsic or extrinsic stimuli by reorganizing its structure, functions, or connections." Neuroplasticity plays a crucial role in developing and maintaining brain function, learning, and memory. It enables the brain to change and adapt to both intrinsic and extrinsic stimuli by reorganizing its structure. This process allows the brain to adjust to different experiences and circumstances and therefore plays a significant role in learning and memory.

== Neuroplasticity and memory ==
Functional neuroplasticity helps explain how the brain forms memories. An example of functional neuroplasticity is long-term potentiation, or LTP. LTP describes the persistent strengthening of synapses in response to repeated stimulation. It is thought to be a key mechanism in learning and memory. Long-term depression, on the other hand, is the weakening of synapses and also plays a role in learning and memory. There are ten principles that help optimize brain function. The first is use it or lose it, learning something once doesn't mean it will be remembered forever. If a skill isn't being used, it will become weaker over time. The second is use it and improve it; practice strengthens skills. The third is specificity, focusing specifically on the exact skill that is wanting to be learned. The fourth is repetition, practicing tasks or reviewing flashcards repeatedly will make them second nature. The fifth principle is that intensity matters, putting in half effort will result in half the benefits. The sixth is timing matters, early action typically brings improved results. The seventh is that salience matters, because the more meaning something holds, the easier the skill or action will be learned. The eighth is that age matters, every brain has brain plasticity, however the process of learning new things is easier at a younger age. The ninth is transference, skills that are related and overlap can be easier to learn or transfer. Lastly, the tenth is interference, something learned can interfere with another skill wanting to be learned.

== False memories ==
A false memory is a distorted recollection of an event. False memories can include details, and facts that aren't true, and entire events never happened. A theory as to why false memories happen is that the brain fills in blanks as a time saving trick. This is called a Confabulation, "a false memory generated to compensate for the holes in a person's memory." Another theory is familiarity or repetition, described as believing something to be true because they hear or see it repeatedly This mere exposure effect makes the brain evaluate repeated stimuli more positively than novel stimuli.

== The mandela effect ==
The brain can also share false memories with other brains, through a term called the Mandela effect. The Mandela effect is a shared false memory, when more than one person has a similar representation or memory of something that never happened. The term is coined from a widespread false memory about Nelson Mandela's death. Researcher Fiona Broome created a website, describing her memories of Mandela's death. Broome remembered various details of news coverage and "she found other people who shared these false memories." However, Nelson Mandela did not die in prison in the 1980s, he died in 2013 after serving prison for 27 years.

== Working memory ==
According to Baddeley's model of working memory, working memory is composed of three parts. First is the central executive which is responsible for a range of regulatory functions including attention, the control of action, and problem solving. Second, the phonological loop, which is specialized for the manipulation and retention of material in particular informational domains. Finally, the visuospatial sketchpad stores material in terms of its visual or spatial features. The strength of the relationships between the three components of working memory vary; the central executive is strongly linked with both the phonological loop as well as the visuospatial sketchpad which are both independent of each other. Some evidence indicates linear increases in performance of working memory from age 3–4 years through to adolescence.

=== Central executive ===
Central executive is an integral of the working memory, and involves the all- inclusive attentional control of the working memory system. Initially Professor in Psychology Robert V. Kail and Professor Meghan Saweikis inferred that the central executive had an important role of storing some information and that the central executive reinforced long-term memory and has the potential to designate resources for focusing, dividing and switching attention. Currently the model of the central executive excludes the possibility of any type of memory storage. However, it does include the understanding that it does have a responsibility for the control and reinforcement of attention. In children from 2–4, the memory storage capacity limitation constrains complex comprehension processes. As the child grows older however, less processing is necessary which opens more storage space for memory.

=== Phonological loop ===
Evidence indicates linear increases in performance from age 4 years through to adolescence. Prior to about 7 years of age, serial recall performance is mediated by the phonological store which is one of two components of the phonological loop. Preschool aged children do not use a subvocal rehearsal strategy to maintain decaying phonological representations in the store but instead they identify visual features of pictures in order to remember them. This is evident first by watching children for overt sign of rehearsal (for example lip movement) and second if the child is given nameable pictures, there are no differences in retrieval found for long versus short words. At the age of seven, children begin to use a subvocal rehearsal process to maximize retention in the phonological store. As development continues, nonauditory memory material is recoded into a phonological code suitable for the phonological loop when possible.

=== Visuospatial sketchpad ===
Younger children (under the age of 5) may be more dependent than older children or adults on using the visuospatial sketchpad to support immediate memory for visual material. Older children adopt a strategy of verbally recoding pictures where possible and also use the phonological loop to mediate performance of the "visual" memory task. Between the ages of 5 and 11, visual memory span increases substantially and it is at this point when adult levels of performance are reached.

=== Episodic buffer ===
The episodic buffer is something that was added to Baddeley' s working model in memory in the year 2000. It is believed to act as a connector of various sources within the memory process. The episodic buffer is a developing concept that is being researched and refined.

In his initial paper, Professor of Psychology Alan Baddeley detailed what he believes to be the biological functioning, location, and purpose of the episodic buffer. The purpose of the episodic buffer is to serve as a bridge between both Working memory and Long-Term-Memory, specifically Episodic Memory. It is believed to be more temporary in its storage capabilities, but nonetheless helps form new information and lasting memory. Since it combines several elements of memory, one could in theory say it is a distributed system. The limits of its abilities in storage have yet to be determined. Other issues include identifying the differences between the Episodic Buffer and Episodic Memory, as well as showing how important and essential the Episodic Buffer is to the Working Model of Memory.

== Long-term memory ==
Long-term memory, also known as episodic and semantic memory, has the ability to store valuable information for a proficient amount of time. According to Longe (2016) the storage of long-term memory could be in assortments of minutes to lifetime, meaning an activity or event attended can be recalled after a few minutes or be stored for a long time. Long term memory uses an important distinguishing factor known as meaning that can help an individual learn; It is used in a form of encoding and it is deemed the primary method of developing long-term memory. Once meaning is understood and applied to information it can impact what one recalls.

Explicit memory becomes much better over the developmental years. However, there are small effects of age on implicit memory, which could be because implicit memory involves more basic processes than declarative memory which would make it less affected by a child's developing cognitive skills and abilities.

=== Infants ===
A surprising finding was that within the same age group of 2 to 3 months, infants could also remember an event or memory that was forgotten over the years. The infant experienced this recollection by a certain factor that might have sparked that forgotten memory. These impressive findings were found by testing the kicking of infants. Researchers placed a mobile over the infant's crib and a ribbon that connects the infant's leg to the mobile. The infants demonstrated to the researchers that they were learning the connection between their kicking and the mobile's movement. Once the allotted time passed, the infant's leg was attached once more to the mobile. Two types of ideas were formed; supposing that the child could energetically start kicking, would lead to the assumption that the infant remembered the connection between the mobile's movement and the child's kicking. Now, if the infant's kicking gingerly become more energetic, that would presume that the infant is relearning the connection, which would suggest that the infant has forgotten the connection made.

The study also indicated that the infant could remember the connection for up to 14 days. However, once certain time has passed the infant's leg is once again connected to the mobile's movement with a ribbon to test of the infant recalled what to do. The infant did not remember what to do, and they were introduced to a certain factor that would aid the infant to remember. According to Professor Robert V. Kail and Professor Meghan Saweikis (2004), if the experimenter moves the mobile showing the infant the movements, as soon as the infant is reconnected to the mobile with a ribbon, the infant will start kicking energetically. The conclusion was that the infant could indeed remember a memory, although time has passed.

Infants who are 5 months or older are able to use emotions to influence their memories. However, at this age, infants will be more likely to remember things that were characterized by positive emotions. Numerous mechanisms that are used to study and infer memory in children cannot be used on infants, due to the process the study is retrieved, which include writing or speaking. The way that researchers study the memory capabilities of infants in this age range is through measuring eye movements between test images presented. After doing this initial round of testing, the researchers would conduct follow-up tests both 5 minutes later and one day later. The follow-up tests shown to the infants included two geometric shapes: one from the original test, and a new shape. The researchers were able to record how long the infants looked at the images in the follow-up tests and measured how long the infants stared at each shape. The infants were more likely to gaze at the geometric shapes from the original tests if they had been paired with positive voices than if they had been paired with neutral or negative voices. This study indicated that infants at this age would be able to better remember shapes and patterns of things if they were associated with positive emotions because positivity would increase the infants' interest and attention.

=== Pre-school children ===
Infants at as early as 7-months-old can conceptually differentiate between categories such as animals and vehicles. Although infants' concepts may be crude by adult standards, they still allow infants to make meaningful semantic distinctions. An example is that infants can differentiate between items belonging to a kitchen and those items belonging to a bathroom. At the very least, these categories lay a foundation for early knowledge development, organizing information in storage and influence future encoding. Infants from 16 months old are able to draw on their semantic knowledge in generalization and inference. This knowledge can also be used by older toddlers, 24-month-olds, to facilitate acquisition and retention of new information. Their knowledge of causal ordering of events can be used to help to recall the sequence of events. Infants have the ability to recall experiences after some time or demonstrate that they have a forming cognitive process.

Pre-school children can be heavily inaccurate in recalling words or numbers they have just learned. Children are more able to recall information, which according to Professor Lucy Henry (2011) children can "predict" memory performance if they have an online experience with a task. What led to this conclusion was the children were given a tape recorder with 10 words, the kids were asked to stop the tape recorder once they thought they could remember all the words mentioned. According to the study 17% children predicted that they knew all 10 words mentioned.

Knowledge itself will not alter retention performance, rather how well that knowledge is structured will alter performance. Better retention was shown with information that had greater cohesion and more elaborative elements. Familiarity and repetition of an experience can also influence the organization of information in storage for preschoolers and older children. Children who experienced an event twice recalled the event better 3 months later than did children who only experienced it once and showed equally good recall at 3 months compared to recall at 2 weeks after experiences.

=== School-age children ===
Age differences in memory are attributed to age-correlated growth in the foundation of knowledge. What children know affects what they encode, how that information is organized in storage, and the manner in which it's retrieved. The greater the background knowledge about the to-be-encoded information, the better that the information is remembered. Because older children have more knowledge than younger children, older children perform better than younger children in most memory tasks. When familiarity and meaningfulness of material were equated across age, developmental differences in memory performance was no longer a factor.

Children's use of memory strategies and the development of metamemory skills are also instrumental in age-related changes in memory, particularly later in childhood years. Knowledge influences memory by affecting retrieval, by facilitating spread of activation among related items in memory and by facilitating the use of strategies. Knowledge also provides better elaboration of information which can strengthen its storage in memory.

=== Adults ===
Memory tends to begin to fade as when enter and go through adulthood. Professor Ane-Victoria Idland et al., investigated the biological factors that begin to form in a person's older life and examined biological markers that could help explain the decrease in memory. They focused on beta amyloid 1–42 (Aβ42), phosphorylated tau (P-tau), total tau, chitinase-3-like protein 1 (YKL-40), fatty acid binding protein 3 (FABP3), and neurofilament light (NFL), and their findings suggest that tauopathy and FABP3 tended to be associated with the most memory decline. As individuals age, the hippocampus appears to begin to lose its ability to make connections to life events and memory.

== Episodic memory ==
By school age, the typical child shows skill in recalling details of past experiences and in organizing those details into a narrative form with cohesion. Memories formed at this age and beyond are more likely to stand the test of time over the years and be recalled in adulthood, compared to earlier memories. Young children can sometimes retain information from specific episodes over very long periods of time, but the particular information a child of a particular age is likely to retain over different periods of time is unpredictable. This depends on the nature of the memory event and individual differences in the child such as gender, parental style of communication, and language ability.

One of the most important aspects of episodic memory according to Psychologist Endel Tulving (1985, 1999) is the element of the individual to cognitively travel to both the past and the future. A studied yet still speculative thought about episodic memory in children is the lack of and anticipated episodic. This suggests that children are more susceptible and successful in remembering certain events (e.g., what are you going to have for lunch, what will you play with in the park, etc.), not because they traveled in both past and future, but that parents are the ones' who generally organize the day, meaning they are the ones who have control over their children's futures.

As with all forms of memory, Episodic Memory is known to also decline with age. However, it can also be said that biological factors such as one's sex also affects how Episodic memory develops and degrades. In a study done by Professor Astri J. Lundervold et al., they decided to investigate the possible reasons behind this. Their findings through several longitudinal and cross-sectional studies found that as mentioned that Episodic memory does decrease with age. In regards to sex they found that women tend to have a slightly lower decrease rate of Episodic Memory than men, -.12 compared to -.14 units. They study however didn't go into other variables such as social-economical-status in regards to how this might affect the decrease rates in age and sex.

== Autobiographical memory ==
The amount of information that is able to be recalled depends on the child's age at the time of the event. Children at the age of 1-2 can recall personal events, though only in fragments when questioned several months later. Two-year-old children form autobiographical memories and remember them over periods of at least several months.

Difficulty in assessing memory in young children can be attributed to their level of language skills; this is because memory tests usually occur in the form of a verbal report. It is unclear whether performance on memory assessments is due to poor memory for the event or to the inability to express what they remember in words. However, memory tests assessing performance with a nonverbal photograph recognition test and behavioral re-enactment showed that children had signs of recall from 27 months, as opposed to 33 months using verbal recall testing.

Autobiographical memory development is related to the emotional state of both children and adults. Professor Leslie Rollins et al.(2018), showed that particularly bad experiences tended to degrade, to be forgotten, and were more related to difficulties remembering than positive memories.

=== Childhood amnesia ===
Childhood amnesia is a phenomenon that ranges from the age of 3–8 years of age. This phenomenon occurs when a child has forgotten memories and cannot recall them. For instance, when a certain event seems forgotten, it may be accessible in the mind's storage with time limit depending on other factors, over a time of months or perhaps a year. In amnesia it is not easily accessible.

Infantile amnesia is the tendency to have few autobiographical memories from below the age of 2–4. This can be attributed to lack of memory rehearsal as young children do not engage in rehearsal of remembered information. There are two theoretical explanations for why this may occur; although they take different approaches, they are not mutually exclusive of each other. The development of a cognitive self is also thought by some to have an effect on encoding and storing early memories.

==== Cognitive self ====
Autobiographical memories can only begin to form after infants have developed a sense of self to whom events having personal significance can occur. Evidence of a sense of self develops towards the end of the second year of life, in between 21 and 24 months of age. The development of a cognitive self provides a new framework from which memories can be organized. With this cognitive advancement, we see the emergence of autobiographical memory and the end of infantile amnesia.

==== Social cultural influences ====
Language and culture play central roles in the early development of autobiographical memory. The manner in which parents discuss the past with their children and how elaborative they are in reminiscing affects how the child encodes the memory. Children whose parents talk in detail about the past are being provided with good opportunities to rehearse their memories. The parents' use of language at the time in which the event occurred can also play a factor in how the child remembers the episode. Cultural differences in parenting styles and parent-child relationships can contribute to autobiographical memory at an early age. Parent-child relationships have also seen as something that causes memory issues in adults as well.

== Memory strategies ==
Memory strategies are ways in which individuals can organize the information that they are processing in order to enhance recall in the future. Memory strategies that are helpful may include but are not limited to verbal rehearsal or mnemonics. The use of memory strategies varies in both the types of strategies used as well as the effectiveness of the strategies used across different age groups.

=== Metamemory ===
As children grow older, they show increasing evidence of metamemory which is the knowledge about their memory and how it works. There is strong evidence that suggests that greater awareness and knowledge about ones memory leads to increased use of memory strategies and greater levels of recall.

In children under 7, the relationship between metamemory, strategy use, and recall is generally very weak or absent. This can be seen when comparing older children (over the age of 7) and preschool children on sorting tasks where children are asked to sort objects into groups that go together (for example animals) and attempt to recall them.

As Adults age they tend to lose the recall ability. In a study by Guerrero Sastoque et al., they discovered that this could be the result of changes in the types of memory strategies used to compensate with their slower recall ability.

==== Preschool children ====
Preschool children use simple tactics for remembering but do not use mental strategies and do not typically differentiate memory and perception. In order to remember objects, they tend to verbally name or visually inspect items and use memory strategies intermittently or inconsistently even if they are aware of how they can improve recall. Memory Strategies are used more consistently by children if they are reminded and taught to use them each time they are processing something that should be remembered.

==== By age 7 ====
By the age of 7, the awareness of the benefits of memory strategies in learning generally arises. The goal is for children to recognize the advantage of using memory strategies such as categorizing rather than simply looking or naming.

At this age, children spontaneously use rehearsal to enhance short-term memory performance and retrieval strategies begin to be used spontaneously without the guidance of others.

Elementary-age children have a significant improvement in their ability to retain information. Children start to understand that in order to not forget what they have learned. It is crucial to create a connection that will aid them to remember next time. Once this skill has been learned or there has been significant progression, children in this age steadily become better at remembering to do things in the future (e.g., throwing out the garbage, closing the bathroom door or doing homework). Children in this stage of their lives often have an attention shifting episodes in which enable to portion of the memory that was expiring to activate once more, not allowing them to forget. Once ascending to the 3rd grade, children are generally categorizing and in return helps the memory.

==== Late elementary school ====
In late elementary school, children engage in self-directed use of organization and demonstrate the ability to impose a semantic structure on the to-be-remembered items to guide memory performance. For example, if a child is packing their bag for school, they can go through each part of their day and think of each item that they need to pack. Children at this age understand the advantages of using memory strategies and make use of strategies like categorization overlooking or naming if they are instructed to think about learning strategies prior to learning.

A strong metacognitive strategy for a student would be practicing reflective and critical thinking skills. For instance, when a child is asked to memorize a song or a poem the teacher will sing or read aloud, essentially comprehending the meaning of certain words and forming a connection is what is generating a student's mind. Once the student is practicing, he or she will be able to approach the song or poem with more understanding, reflective and problem solving.

==== Early adolescence ====
In early adolescence, children begin to use elaborative rehearsal meaning that items are not simply kept in mind but rather are processed more deeply. They also prefer to use memory strategies such as categorization rather than simple rehearsal, looking or naming and use these strategies without needing to think about memory strategies prior to learning.

Consequently, it is crucial to acknowledge that a child's brain is constantly experiencing development from life adaptation. Children need to be an environment that fortifies and encourages cognitive development in the beginning. However, in proportion too literature a child's mind is a remarkable mechanism that if a child has not been adequately given the optimal care and stimulation for brain development. A child can inverse the damage sustained in their early life and have an opportunity to develop.
