= Rhinal cortex =

Region of the brain

The rhinal cortex is the cortex surrounding the rhinal fissure, including the entorhinal cortex and the perirhinal cortex. It is a cortical region in the medial temporal lobe that is made up of Brodmann areas 28, 34, 35 and 36.

Input from all sensory cortices flows to the perirhinal and parahippocampal cortices, whence it continues to the entorhinal cortex and then the hippocampus. After feedback from the hippocampus, information then returns in the reverse sequence to the sensory cortices.

== Explicit memory ==
The rhinal cortex is proposed to be part of the neural circuit for explicit memory.
Studies comparing the results of selective lesions of the hippocampus and of the rhinal cortex found that lesions of the hippocampus alone did not impair performance on object recognition tests, but that lesions of the rhinal cortex alone caused severe anterograde and retrograde impairments on these tests. The conclusion was that object recognition (semantic memory) depends on the rhinal cortex.
