= Autonoetic consciousness =

Human ability for introspection

Autonoetic consciousness is the human ability to mentally place oneself in the past and future (i.e. mental time travel) or in counterfactual situations (i.e. alternative outcomes), and to thus be able to examine one's own thoughts.

One's sense of self affects their behavior, in the present, past and future. It relates to how one reflects on their own past behavior, how they feel about it, and this in turn determines if they do it again.

It is episodic memory that deals with self-awareness, memories of the self and inward thoughts that may be projected onto future actions of an individual. It was "proposed by Endel Tulving for self-awareness, allowing the rememberer to reflect on the contents of episodic memory". Moreover, autonoetic consciousness involves behaviors such as mental time travel, self-projection, and episodic future thinking, all of which have often been proposed as exclusively human capacities.

== The self ==
Autonoetic consciousness is important in our formation of our "self" identity. What we have done in the past becomes a part of our "self" and the ability to reflect on this influences our behavior in the now.

In psychology, the self is often used for that set of attributes that a person attaches to themself most firmly, the attributes that the person finds it difficult or impossible to imagine themselves without. Identity is also used to describe this.

In philosophy, the self is the agent, the knower and the ultimate locus of personal identity. This self, the identity of which is at the bottom of every action, and involved in every bit of knowledge, is the self philosophers worry about. Nevertheless, care of the self is of utmost importance in the bios-logos relationship.

== The parietal cortex ==
The parietal cortex is strongly involved in autonoetic consciousness. Damage to areas of the parietal cortex can lead to different functioning errors, including changes in personality.

Lesions in the right parietal lobe influence personality, and this could be because the parietal lobe has to do with our sense of self. Our sense of self is strongly reflected in our personality.

Some common tests for parietal lobe function are: Kimura Box Test (apraxia) and the Two-Point Discrimination Test (somatosensory).

== Episodic memory and the self ==
For a coherent and meaningful life, conscious self-representation is mandatory. Autonoetic consciousness is thought to emerge by retrieval of memory of personally experienced events (episodic memory). Without the ability to reflect on our past experiences, we would be stuck in a state of constant awakening, without a past and therefore unable to prepare for the future.

Episodic memory is the memory we have for our past experiences, which influence our now, and our future. This is different from procedural memory, which is our memory for how to do things. Episodic memories influence our thinking about ourselves, good and bad.

Autobiographical memories can be retrieved from either the first person perspective, in which individuals see the event through their own eyes, or from the third person perspective, in which individuals see themselves and the event from the perspective of an external observer.

A growing body of research suggests that the visual perspective from which a memory is retrieved has important implications for a person's thoughts, feelings, and goals, and is integrally related to a host of self-evaluative processes.

== Event-related potentials ==
Event-related potentials (ERPs) can measure autonoetic consciousness scientifically. Event-related brain potentials (ERPs) are a non-invasive method of measuring brain activity during cognitive processing. The transient electric potential shifts (so-called ERP components) are time-locked to the stimulus onset (e.g., the presentation of a word, a sound, or an image). Each component reflects brain activation associated with one or more mental operations.

In contrast to behavioral measures such as error rates and response times, ERPs are characterized by simultaneous multi-dimensional online measures of polarity (negative or positive potentials), amplitude, latency, and scalp distribution. Therefore, ERPs can be used to distinguish and identify psychological and neural sub-processes involved in complex cognitive, motor, or perceptual tasks.

Unlike fMRI, they provide extremely high time resolution, in the range of one millisecond.

The methodological advantages of ERPs have resulted in an ever increasing number of ERP studies in cognitive neuroscience, cognitive psychology, psycholinguistics, neurolinguistics, neuropsychology, and neurology. ERPs have also been used to identify patients who seem to be "brain-dead" but in fact are not.

There is an event-related potential (ERP) experiment of human recognition memory that explored the relation between conscious awareness and electrophysiological activity of the brain. ERPs were recorded from healthy adults while they made "remember" and "know" recognition judgments about previously seen words, reflecting "Autonoetic" and "Noetic" awareness, respectively. The ERP effects differed between the two kinds of awareness while they were similar for "true" and "false" recognition.

In a study of real-time noninvasive recordings of the brain's electrical activity (event-related potentials, ERPs), there was a common neural "signature" that is associated with self-referential processing regardless of whether subjects are retrieving general knowledge (noetic awareness) or re-experiencing past episodes (autonoetic awareness).

== Social anxiety disorder ==
Social anxiety disorder (SAD) is an example of how bad experiences can also lead to our behaviors. It demonstrates how our thoughts influence our feelings about ourselves and therefore our actions in society around us. It has to do with a person's self-esteem, fear of failure, shame, fear of offending, and fear of strangers.

Cognitive models of social anxiety disorder believe the social self is a key psychological mechanism that maintains fear of negative evaluation in social and performance situations. Consequently, a distorted self-view is evident when recalling painful autobiographical social memories, as reflected in linguistic expression, negative self-beliefs, and emotion and avoidance.

To test this hypothesis, 42 adults diagnosed with SAD and 27 non-psychiatric healthy controls composed autobiographical narratives of distinct social anxiety related situations, generated negative self-beliefs, and provided emotion and avoidance ratings.

Although narratives were matched for initial emotional intensity and present vividness, linguistic analyses demonstrated that, compared to the control group, the SAD group employed more self-referential, anxiety, and sensory words, and made fewer references to other people. Social anxiety symptom severity, however, was associated with greater self-referential negative self-beliefs (NSB) in SAD only.

SAD reported greater current self-conscious emotions when recalling autobiographical social situations, and greater active avoidance of similar situations than did the control group. Autobiographical memory of social situations in SAD may influence current and future thinking, emotion, and behavioral avoidance.

== See also ==
- Executive dysfunction
- Fantasy-prone personality
- Noetic consciousness
