= Prodege =

American online marketing company

Prodege, LLC
- Company type: Private
- Industry: Online marketing, consumer surveys, market research
- Founded: 2005
- Founder: Josef Gorowitz
- Headquarters: El Segundo, California
- Key people: Charles "Chuck" Davis, CEO
- Products: Swagbucks, MyPoints, Tada, InboxDollars, CouponCause, Pollfish, Bitburst, AdGate Media, Upromise
- Number of employees: 600
- Website: www.prodege.com

Prodege, LLC (/proʊdeɪˈʒeɪ/) is an American online marketing, consumer polling, and market research company based in El Segundo, California. The company develops consumer rewards and polling programs under various brands including Swagbucks, MyPoints, InboxDollars, CouponCause, Tada, Ysense, Upromise, and Pollfish.

== History ==
Prodege was founded in Torrance, California, in 2005 by entrepreneur Josef Gorowitz. The company originally partnered with search providers to build a platform for raising charitable donations. Supporters of the charities would earn money for the charities while surfing and shopping using white labeled web browsers. The company started offering the custom browsers to brands as a way to earn money from their fans' online activities. Early customers included the Green Bay Packers football team, and singer Kanye West.

In February 2008, Prodege launched the online rewards portal Swagbucks.com – under co-founders Josef Gorowitz and Scott Dudelson – and introduced Swag Bucks (SB) as a digital currency earned for activity throughout its network of websites.

In January 2013, Prodege founder Josef Gorowitz appointed former Shopzilla and Fandango CEO Chuck Davis as the company's executive chairman.

In May 2014, Prodege announced that Technology Crossover Ventures (TCV) had invested $60 million into Prodege. Prodege also announced Executive Chairman Chuck Davis had been appointed as Prdege’s new CEO and Chairman, while Josef Gorowitz assumed the title of Founder and President. Chuck Davis was also mentioned as being a TCV Venture partner.

In July 2014, Prodege announced its acquisition of SodaHead.com, an online polling technology platform founded by Jason Feffer. SodaHead.com CEO Chris Dominguez and Founder Jason Feffer joined Prodege's executive leadership team in the move.

In April 2016, Prodege bought rewards site MyPoints from United Online, the company formed by the merger of online services companies NetZero and Juno Online Services.

In August 2017, the company acquired Greenwood Village, Colorado–based cash-back shopping and coupon site ShopAtHome.

In May 2019, the company bought Cotterweb Enterprises, a Minnesota-based operator of reward sites in the US, Canada, and the UK. In July, Prodege partnered with online local service deal company Groupon to develop a local merchant reward card program for customers.

In February 2020, Prodege bought digital coupon company CouponCause. In May, Prodege bought Upromise, a loyalty program focused on saving for college, from student loan company Sallie Mae. Prodege partnered with Isometric Solutions and Panel Consulting to provide polling for the Prediction Survey, a political forecast developed by Thomas Miller during the 2020 Georgia Senate election.

On May 24, 2021, ShopAtHome.com was relaunched as Tada.com.

In February 2022, Prodege acquired Pollfish, a DIY market research platform.

In July 2022, Prodege acquired AdGate Media, a digital advertising service company founded in 2011, originally based in New York City.

== Services ==
Prodege offers online marketing services under several different consumer brands.

- Swagbucks – a website and application where users shop and participate in other earning activities for cash rewards and gift cards.
- MyPoints – an online rewards site.
- InboxDollars – an online rewards site. Also known in the UK as InboxPounds.
- CouponCause – a coupon site that donates the money users save to non-profits.
- Upromise – a rewards program that helps members save for key milestones like education.
- Tada – a site that provides rewards from grocery receipts.
- Ysense – a gift card rewards program for customers that shop and take surveys.
- Pollfish – a market research platform.
