= Kmart =

American retailing company

- Logo used since 2004
- Type: Subsidiary
- Industry: Retail
- Founded: July 31, 1899; 127 years ago (as Kresge's); January 25, 1962; 64 years ago (first Kmart store opened) in; Garden City, Michigan
- Founder: S. S. Kresge
- Headquarters: Troy, Michigan (1962–2005); Hoffman Estates, Illinois (since 2005)
- Number of locations: 3 (1 in the mainland US)
- Areas served: Kmart.com: The 50 United States +APO/FPO. Physical stores: US Virgin Islands, Guam, Miami area
- Products: Clothing; shoes; linen and bedding; jewelry; accessories; health and beauty products; electronics; toys; food; drinks; sporting goods; automotive; hardware; appliances; housewares; pet products; pharmacy; garden center
- Revenue: US$25.146 billion (2015 SHC)
- Parent: Transformco
- Website: kmart.com

Kmart (/ˈkeɪ.mɑːrt/, KAY-mart), formerly Kmart Corporation, is a department store chain and online retailer in the United States and its territories.

Originally incorporated in 1899 as S. S. Kresge Corporation, Kmart became one of the largest retailers in the world, operating 2,486 stores globally at its peak in 1994. Its big-box stores sold a large variety of goods, including clothing, appliances, electronics, housewares, and food.

The company began a slow decline in the late-1990s, leading to its first Chapter 11 bankruptcy filing in 2002. In 2005, Kmart and Sears merged to form Sears Holdings Corporation. Store closures continued gradually until Sears Holdings Corporation filed for bankruptcy in 2018. The following year, Kmart became a subsidiary of Transform SR Brands LLC, a privately held company that was formed in 2019 to acquire assets from Sears Holdings, which included 202 remaining Kmart stores. Additional Kmart closures rapidly followed, bringing the number of stores remaining to under a dozen by early 2022. The company closed its last full-sized big-box store in the mainland United States in 2024.

As of 2026, there are three remaining Kmart locations: a big-box department store in Charlotte Amalie, the US Virgin Islands, a big-box store in Tamuning, Guam, and a smaller location in Kendale Lakes, Florida.

== History ==
=== Early years ===
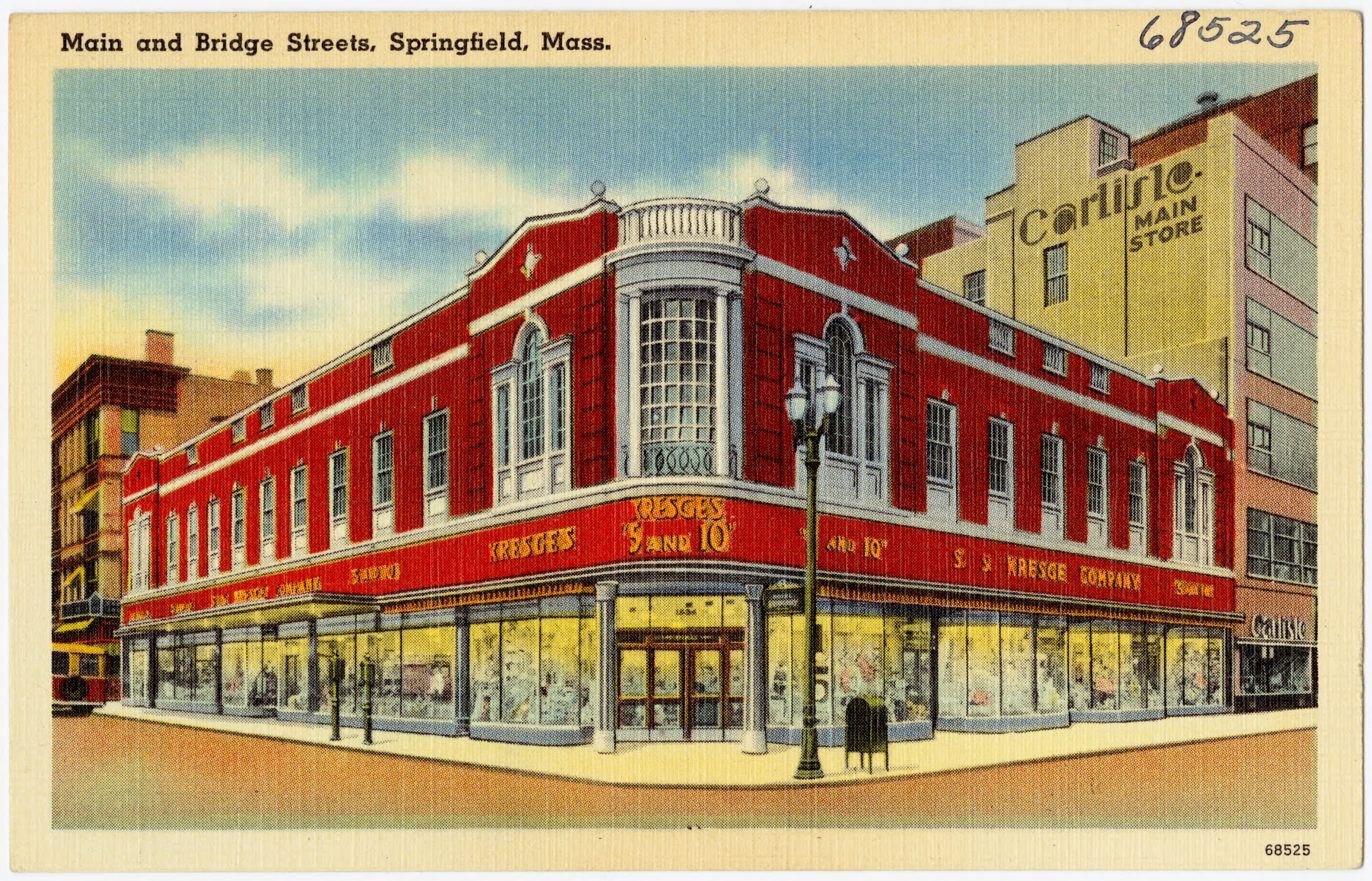
This 1940s postcard shows the Kresge store in Springfield, Massachusetts (Store #26).

S. S. Kresge, the founder of the company that would become Kmart, met variety-store pioneer Frank Winfield Woolworth while working as a traveling salesman and selling to all 19 of Woolworth's stores at the time. In 1897, Kresge invested $6,700 saved from his job into a five-and-dime store in Memphis, Tennessee. He jointly owned the first store with his former tinware customer, John G. McCrory. Kresge and McCrory added a second store in downtown Detroit the following year. These were the first S.S. Kresge stores. After two years of partnership, he traded McCrory his share in the Memphis store, plus $3,000, for full ownership of the Detroit store, and formed the Kresge & Wilson Company with his brother-in-law, Charles J. Wilson.

In 1912, Kresge incorporated the S.S. Kresge Company in Delaware with 85 stores. In 1916, Kresge incorporated a new S.S. Kresge Company in Michigan and took over the operations of the original company, becoming the modern-day Kmart company. The company was first listed on the New York Stock Exchange on May 23, 1918. During World War I, Kresge experimented with raising the limit on prices in his stores to $1. By 1924, Kresge was worth approximately $375 million and owned real estate of the approximate value of $100 million. Growth early in the 20th century remained brisk, with 257 stores in 1924, rising to 597 stores by 1929. Kresge retired as president in 1925, continuing as the company's chairman. The Great Depression reduced profitability and resulted in store closings, but the number rose to 682 in 1940. After the war, shopping patterns changed and many customers moved out of the cities into the suburbs.

=== 1960s–1970s ===
Kmart's longest lasting logo, used from 1969 to 1990

Under the leadership of executive Harry Cunningham, the S.S. Kresge Company opened the first Kmart-branded store, a 27,000-square-foot (2,500-square-meter) location, on January 25, 1962, in San Fernando, California. Referred to by Kresge as a "bantam" Kmart, it was originally intended to be a traditional Kresge store until late in the planning process. This opening occurred just six months before the first Walmart opened. Meanwhile, the first full-sized Kmart, at 80,000 square feet (7,400 square meters), opened on March 1, 1962, at 29600 Ford Road in Garden City, Michigan. Both Cunningham and Sam Walton were inspired by Ann & Hope, which they each visited in 1961. Seventeen more Kmart stores opened in 1962. Kmart Foods, a now-defunct chain of Kmart supermarkets, also opened in that decade. Although the chain continued to open Kmart-branded stores, the company was still officially known as S.S. Kresge Company.

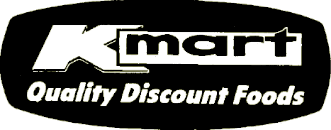
The Kmart Foods logo used during the 1960s

Company founder Kresge died on October 18, 1966, at age 99.

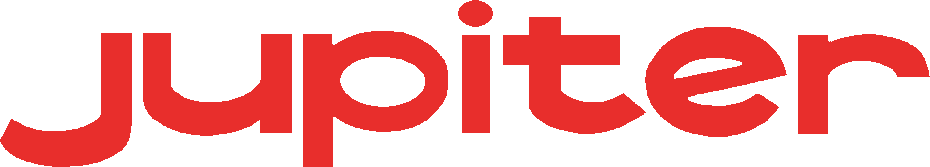
Jupiter, an extra discount chain, was started around this time

Around the time of the opening of the first Kmart, some poorly performing S.S. Kresge stores were converted to a new "Jupiter Discount Stores" brand, which was conceived as a bare-bones, deep discount outfit. During the 1970s, Kmart put a number of competing retailers out of business. Kresge, Jupiter and Kmart stores mainly competed with other store chains like Zayre, Ames, Bradlees, Caldor, Hills, and those that were operated by MMG-McCrory Stores (McCrory, McLellan, H.L. Green, J.J. Newberry, S.H. Kress, TG&Y, Silver's and eventually G.C. Murphy Co.). In 1977, S.S. Kresge Company changed its name to K Mart Corporation.

=== 1980s: Last Kresge stores ===
In 1980, Vice Chairman Bernard M. Fauber was elected chairman and CEO of Kmart.

In April 1981, the 2,000th Kmart store opened in Kearny, New Jersey which eventually closed in May 2021. By the end of 1981, there were 2,055 Kmart stores across the United States and Canada.

In 1987, the Kmart Corporation sold its remaining 76 Kresge and Jupiter stores in the United States to McCrory Stores, and the brands were almost entirely discontinued, although Canadian Kresge and Jupiter stores continued to operate until 1994.

Kmart experimented with co-branding in 1985, when the in-store cafeteria at the store in Canton, Michigan, was converted to a Wendy's. During the 1980s, Kmart's in-store cafeterias and delis also gained popularity for their sub sandwiches, which developed a cult following for their distinctive ingredients and affordability.

Additionally, Kmart co-branded with Bruno's Supermarkets to create a new hypermarket chain called American Fare.

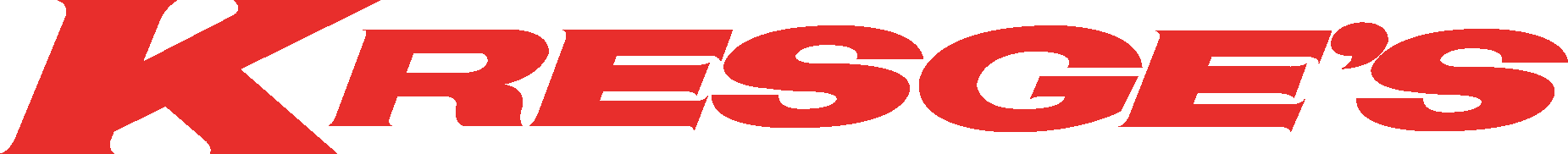
The final Kresge's logo that was discontinued in 1990 as the chain began to shift to only focus on the Kmart brand

Until November 1990, when it was passed by Walmart, Kmart was the second-largest retailer in the United States, after Sears. In the late 1980s and into the 1990s, the corporate office shifted much of its focus from the Kmart stores to other companies it had acquired or created, such as Sports Authority, Builders Square, and Waldenbooks.

=== Blue Light Special ===
The Blue Light Special was an in-store sales promotion that lasted for a short period during regular hours. It was advertised using a rotating blue light, similar to the style used on police cars, and announced over the public address system with the phrase "Attention, Kmart shoppers", which eventually became a pop culture reference. The original concept was a limited-time offer to sell slower-moving merchandise. First introduced in 1965, the promotion was retired in 1991.

Kmart periodically brought back the Blue Light Special during the 2000s. It was started in 2001, discontinued in 2002, briefly revived in 2005, revived again on Saturdays in 2009 (offering surprise hour-long sales on selected merchandise) and for a final time in November 2015.

=== 1990–2001: New image ===
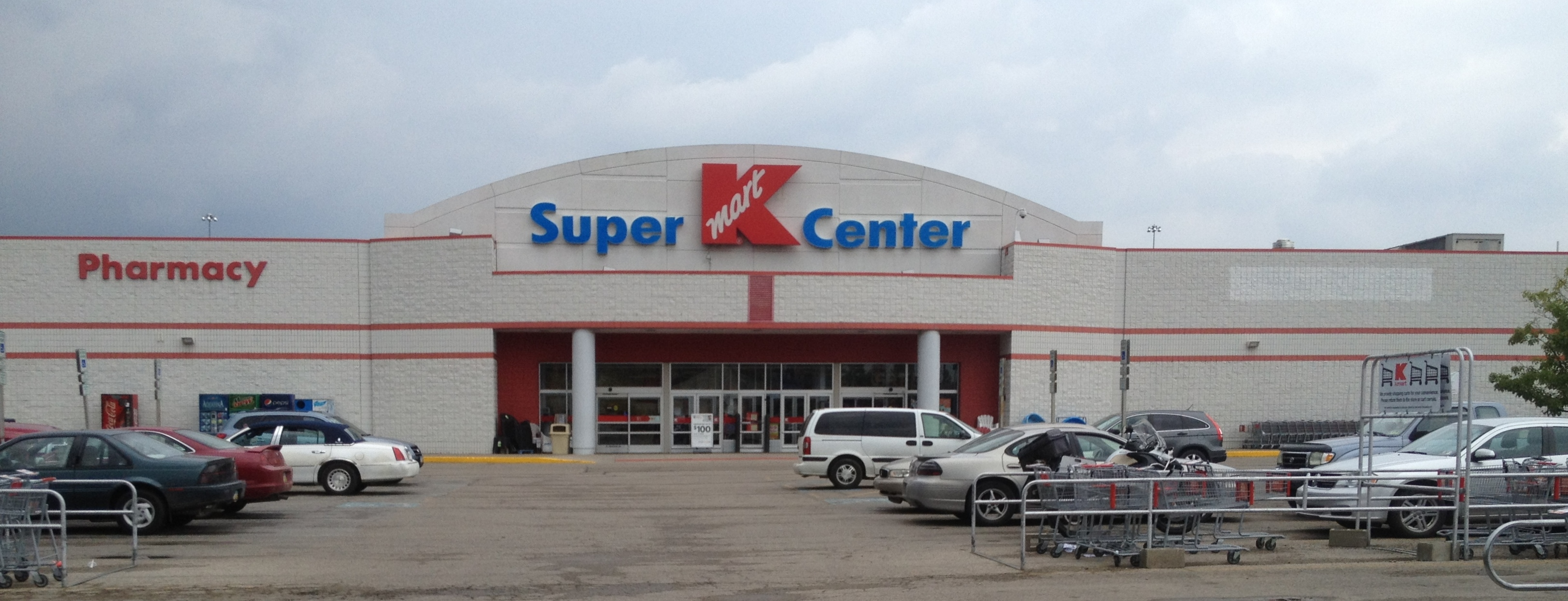
The front of the Super Kmart Center store in Cambridge, Ohio (store #3555), as it appears before it was downsized in 2015 and closed in 2018; this location is now Rural King

In an effort to update its image in 1990, Kmart introduced a new logo. It replaced the old-style italic "K" and turquoise "mart" with a red block letter "K" containing the word "mart" written in script. Kmart began remodeling stores shortly thereafter. That same year, Little Caesars Pizza opened its first in-store restaurant at a Kmart in Rochester, Michigan. Coincidentally, both companies were founded in Garden City, Michigan, Little Caesars in 1959 and Kmart 1962. In 1995, Kmart attempted to reinvent itself by using the short-lived name Today's Kmart. This 1990 logo was eventually replaced in 2004 with the current design.

Kmart's red classic logo (1990–2004)

The Super Kmart Center logo that was used primarily in the early 1990s

On July 25, 1991, Kmart opened its first Super Kmart Center (Super Kmart) in Medina Township, Ohio. This location featured a full-service grocery store with a deli, seafood counter, and bakery, alongside general Kmart merchandise. However, the store was downsized in 2011 and closed in early 2012 following poor Christmas 2011 sales. The second ground-up Super Kmart Center opened in Copley Township, Ohio, and featured an in-store video rental center and a carryout Chinese restaurant. This location has also shut down. The last Super Kmart Center in Howland Township, Ohio, closed on April 8, 2018. Besides the Medina and Copley locations, many more Super Kmarts opened nationwide.

The company would again revise its name in 1991 after 14 years, changing slightly to Kmart Corporation.

In 1992, Kmart entered the Eastern European market with the purchase of 13 stores in the former Czechoslovakia. These stores were sold off in 1996.

The company also began to offer exclusive merchandise by Martha Stewart, Kathy Ireland, Jaclyn Smith, Lauren Hutton, and Thalía. Other recognizable brands included exclusively licensed merchandising of products relating to Sesame Street and Disney. Actress and television personality Rosie O'Donnell and actress/director and producer Penny Marshall were among the company's most recognized spokespersons.

In 1994, Kmart executed its very first conversion and expansion of a traditional Kmart store into a Super Kmart Center in Fresno, California on Shaw Avenue. The store originally opened in 1992 and was reopened as a 190,000 square foot Super Kmart on September 18, 1994.

In September 1995, Kmart sold its money-losing in-store auto repair centers to Penske Corporation for $112 million to operate them as Penske Auto Centers. Penske later closed the auto repair centers in 2002 as a result of a payment dispute with Kmart.

On April 23, 1997, Kmart opened a new format named Big Kmart, at Brickyard Mall in Chicago, Illinois. The format focused on home fashions, children's apparel, and consumables (The Pantry). Most Kmart stores were remodeled to this format during the late 1990s and the early 2000s. Initially, this approach was successful and sales numbers had grown by 10 to 15% in the Kmart stores converted to the Big Kmart format. During 1997 and 1998, the company either converted regular Kmart stores into or opened outright 1,245 Big Kmart locations. By 1998, 62% of Kmart's stores were Big Kmart locations. In 1998, Kmart acquired 45 former Venture stores and converted them into Big Kmart locations. There was a high of 1,900 Big Kmart stores during the year 2000, compared to about 100 for Super Kmart and another 100 remaining traditional Kmart locations.

This Super Kmart Center logo was used on store maps and the former Super Kmart Center stores in Mexico during the 1990s.

The Sports Authority was acquired by Kmart in 1990 and spun off five years later. Kmart's profitability and sales peaked in 1992, and the later decline is attributed to competition with Walmart, Target, and internet shopping. In 1994, Kmart announced they would close 110 stores. Unlike its competitors, such as Walmart and Target, Kmart failed to invest in computer technology to manage its supply chain. Furthermore, Kmart maintained a high dividend, which reduced the amount of money that was available for improving its stores. Many business analysts also faulted the company for failing to create a coherent brand image.

The second Super Kmart Center logo, spelled out as Super Kmart, was used for stores that opened in the late 1990s (1996–2001).

The Big Kmart logo, stylized as BIG Kmart, was used for stores that were opened or renovated in the late 1990s (1997–2001).

In 1997, Kmart launched the Kmart Cash Card as a replacement for the paper gift certificates and to facilitate the return process. In July 1999, Kmart hired SuperValu and Fleming to distribute $3.9 billion worth of food and other related products to all Kmart stores.

In 1999, after the first expansion in Fresno, California in 1994, Kmart Corporation started expanding more stores to Super Kmart Centers. The first of this new test was located in Taylor, Michigan on Van Born Road, which originally opened in 1964 as a standard Kmart store. It was expanded and remodeled into a Super Kmart Center and reopened on October 6 of that year (with a formal grand opening on October 10). Kmart converted more traditional stores into Super Kmart Centers across 2000 and 2001, including locations in Aurora and Englewood, Colorado, Indianapolis, Indiana, Caguas, Puerto Rico, Chicago, Illinois, Montgomery, Alabama, Rogers, Arkansas, and Auburn Hills, Bloomfield Hills, and Utica, Michigan.

In 2000, Kmart and Capital One launched an all-new co-branded MasterCard as a replacement for the private label Kmart credit cards.

Also in 2000, Kmart expanded the Martha Stewart Everyday Garden Collection to include live plants and seeds. Kmart also launched the Martha Stewart Everyday Kitchen, which is a complete line of housewares essentials.

In July 2000, Kmart closed 72 underperforming stores, while opening 20 new Big Kmart stores, converting 12 regular Kmart stores into Super Kmart Center stores, and opening 5 new Super Kmart Center stores. The company announced a planned major restructuring, in which Kmart would invest in new customer check-out and new inventory management technology and other related systems.

==== 2001: Final year before filling for bankruptcy ====
Kmart would be hit with two separate lawsuits by Japanese video game company Sega and retail competitor Target. In February 2001, Sega would sue Kmart for a claimed failure to pay $2.2 million of $25.9 million for Dreamcast game systems. In August, Target would sue Kmart, claiming that the company's "Dare to Compare" advertising campaign inaccurately compared its own prices with those of Target a majority of the time on in-store signs.

In early 2001, Kmart announced plans to phase out the Big Kmart format, shifting focus toward ground-up new builds and Super Center expansions.

The Super Kmart Center logo that was used on some stores that opened during 2001

On August 18, 2001, Kmart opened a $15 million, 143,000-square-foot supercenter at 1405 South Eastern Avenue in Henderson, Nevada. The store closed at the end of March 2017.

On October 25, 2001, Kmart announced that it is adding 15 new Kmart SuperCenters to its portfolio by November of the year, as part of the company's plan to expand their Kmart SuperCenter store portfolio and make groceries available at stores, bringing the total number of supercenters to 124 by the end of the year. 10 of these added supercenters were converted from traditional Kmart stores within the existing space, and 3 stores were expanded and converted from existing Big Kmart stores.

The two new Kmart SuperCenters opened in late 2001 that was built from the ground up was at 19990 Telegraph Road in Detroit, Michigan, which was opened on November 17th of the year, and 12025 North 32nd Street in Phoenix, Arizona, which was opened on November 10th of the year.

Also in this year, Kmart opened two final Big Kmart stores at 296 Garfield Avenue in Cranston, Rhode Island and 374 Windsor Highway in New Windsor, New York. Both locations were closed by November 2017 as a plan to close 28 Kmart stores.

However, Kmart having filed for bankruptcy in January 2002, the company was unable to open any new Super Kmart Center stores, and construction was halted on others (such as in Mesa, Arizona, Margate, Florida, and Albuquerque, New Mexico), no matter how close the stores were to completion. Kmart also signed a $4.5 billion arrangement that year with Fleming, making them the sole food and consumables distributor for the company's stores.

=== 2002–2009: First bankruptcy and merger with Sears ===
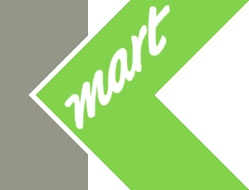
Kmart's lime green logo that was used only at five prototype locations in 2002

On January 22, 2002, Kmart filed for Chapter 11 bankruptcy protection under the leadership of its then-chairman Charles Conaway and president Mark Schwartz. Conaway, who successfully expanded CVS Corporation, accepted an offer to take the helm at Kmart along with a loan of $5 million (equivalent to $8.95 million in 2025). At the time when it filed for bankruptcy, Kmart operated 2,114 stores across all 50 states in the United States in addition to Puerto Rico, Guam, and the U.S. Virgin Islands, employing about 275,000 people.

In a scandal similar to that involving Enron, Conaway and Schwartz were accused of misleading shareholders and other company officials about the company's financial crisis while making millions and allegedly spending the company's money on airplanes, houses, boats and other luxuries. At a conference for Kmart employees on January 22, Conaway accepted "full blame" for the financial disaster. As Kmart emerged from bankruptcy, Conaway was forced to step down, and was asked to pay back all the loans he had taken.

After dismissing Conaway and Schwartz, Kmart closed more than 300 stores in the U.S., including all the locations in Alaska, and laid off around 34,000 workers as part of the restructuring process. Kmart introduced five prototype stores with a new logo, layout, and lime green and gray color scheme, one in White Lake, Michigan, and four in central Illinois (Peoria, Pekin, Morton and Washington). The new layout was touted as having wider aisles and improved selection and lighting, and the city or town's name was featured under the new Kmart logo at the front entrance. However, Kmart could not afford a full-scale rollout. The lime green prototype was abandoned for the new Kmart "Orange" concept that rolled out at several of its locations throughout the United States in 2006.

While Kmart was going through bankruptcy, a significant amount of Kmart's outstanding debt was purchased by ESL Investments, a hedge fund controlled by Edward Lampert. Lampert worked to accelerate the bankruptcy process.

On October 19, 2002, Kmart opened a store at 250 New Road in Somers Point, New Jersey, its only new location in the year. This store was ultimately the last traditional Kmart that was built from the ground up. The store closed before Christmas in December 2019.

On January 13, 2003, Kmart announced the closure of 326 stores due to a lack of profitability and poor sales.

On May 7, 2003, Kmart emerged from bankruptcy. On June 10, 2003, Kmart began trading on the NASDAQ stock market with the ticker symbol of KMRT with Lampert serving as the chairman and with ESL Investments controlling 53% of the new company for an investment of less than $1 billion. Lampert dismissed his concerns that the smaller company would be at a disadvantage, stating "The focus that a lot of people have in retail revolves around sales, but sales without profit do not allow a business to be successful in the long term." He began to improve the company's balance sheet by reducing inventory, cutting costs, and closing underperforming stores. By the fourth quarter of 2003, Kmart posted its first profitable quarter in three years, although it has since returned to an operating loss.

On July 23, 2004, a new Kmart logo featuring a large red "K" with "kmart" in small block letters underneath it was announced. On August 12, 2004, Kmart and E! Entertainment Television announced a new, exclusive, cross-promotional clothing brand called Attention. Attention was launched as a new clothing brand that would be sold only at Kmart stores and would be used to promote E! News Live. Kmart had previously signed a similar deal with the WB Network to have the cast of five WB shows wear Kmart branded clothing during shows.

On November 8, 2004, Kmart launched the Kmart Rewards credit card that is managed by HSBC Bank.

The third Super Kmart Center logo, spelled out as Kmart Supercenter, was only used for printed ads and street signs (2004–2018).

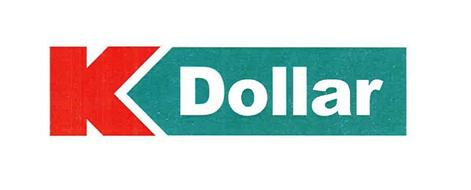
The KDollar logo (November 2004–2012)

On November 17, 2004, Kmart's management announced its intention to purchase Sears for $11 billion. As part of the merger, the Kmart Holding Corporation (the company that owns Kmart) would be transferred to the new Sears Holdings Corporation and Sears would be purchased by the new Sears Holdings Corporation. The new corporation announced that it would continue to operate stores under both the Sears and Kmart brands. Around this time, Kmart changed its logo from a red K with the script "mart" inside, to the same K with the chain's name in lowercase letters below it. Kmart's headquarters were relocated to Hoffman Estates, Illinois, and in 2012 the sprawling headquarters complex in Troy, Michigan, was acquired by the Forbes Company, which owns the nearby upscale mall, Somerset Collection. No concrete plans for redevelopment of the site had been announced.

In 2005, Sears Holdings Corporation introduced the Sears Essentials store format, which would serve as a Kmart-Sears hybrid. Sears Essentials stores were freestanding (not located at a shopping mall) stores. In 2006, the company discontinued the Sears Essentials name, and renamed all of the Sears Essentials stores as Sears Grand stores.

Kmart started remodeling stores to the "Orange" prototype in 2005. In 2006, the typical white and blue interior of the stores was changed to orange and brown, and shelf heights were lowered to create better sightlines. The remodeled stores contained an appliance department with Kenmore Appliances and most had hardware departments that soldCraftsman tools, which prior to the merger had been exclusive to Sears stores. Some auto centers left vacant by Penske after Kmart filed for bankruptcy had been converted to Sears Auto Centers.

In July 2009, Sears Holdings opened its first Sears-branded appliance store inside a Kmart. The 4,000 sq ft (370 m^{2}) store-within-a-store opened inside the former garden department of a Birmingham, Alabama, Kmart. It was two-thirds the size of the appliance department in most Sears stores, but larger than the 2,500 sq ft (230 m^{2}) appliance department in remodeled Kmart stores.

In October 2009, it was reported that Kmart and Martha Stewart Living Omnimedia failed to come to a new agreement. This came after Stewart made remarks on CNBC that her line at Kmart had deteriorated, particularly after the Sears merger.

In November 2009, Kmart reported its first year-over-year sales increase of 0.5% since 2005, and only the second such increase since 2001.

=== 2010–2018: Kmart and Sears Holdings ===
During the 2010s, many of Kmart's stores were considered to be outdated and in decaying condition.

On December 27, 2011, Sears Holdings announced that 100 to 120 Sears and Kmart stores would close.

In 2014, news reports indicated that Kmart was liquidating dozens of stores across the United States. Kmart's parent company, Sears Holdings Corporation, underwent financial distress throughout the year, sparking an unspecified number of closings of Sears and Kmart locations amid vendors' and lenders' concerns about its liquidity. Along with store closings, measures included the spinning off its Lands' End division, selling most of its stake in Sears Canada, issuing debt and taking on loans that cumulatively put it on track to raise $1.445 billion in cash in 2014. Howard Riefs, a company spokesman who has often spoken on behalf of Kmart, said, "Store closures are part of a series of actions we're taking to reduce on-going expenses, adjust our asset base and accelerate the transformation of our business model."

On October 10, 2014, Kmart was a victim of a data breach concerning customers' credit and debit card information. On October 19, Kmart stated, "Based on the forensic investigation to date, no personal information, no debit card PIN numbers, no email addresses and no social security numbers were obtained by those criminally responsible. There is also no evidence that kmart.com customers were impacted. This data breach has been contained and the malware has been removed. I sincerely apologize for any inconvenience this may cause our members and customers."

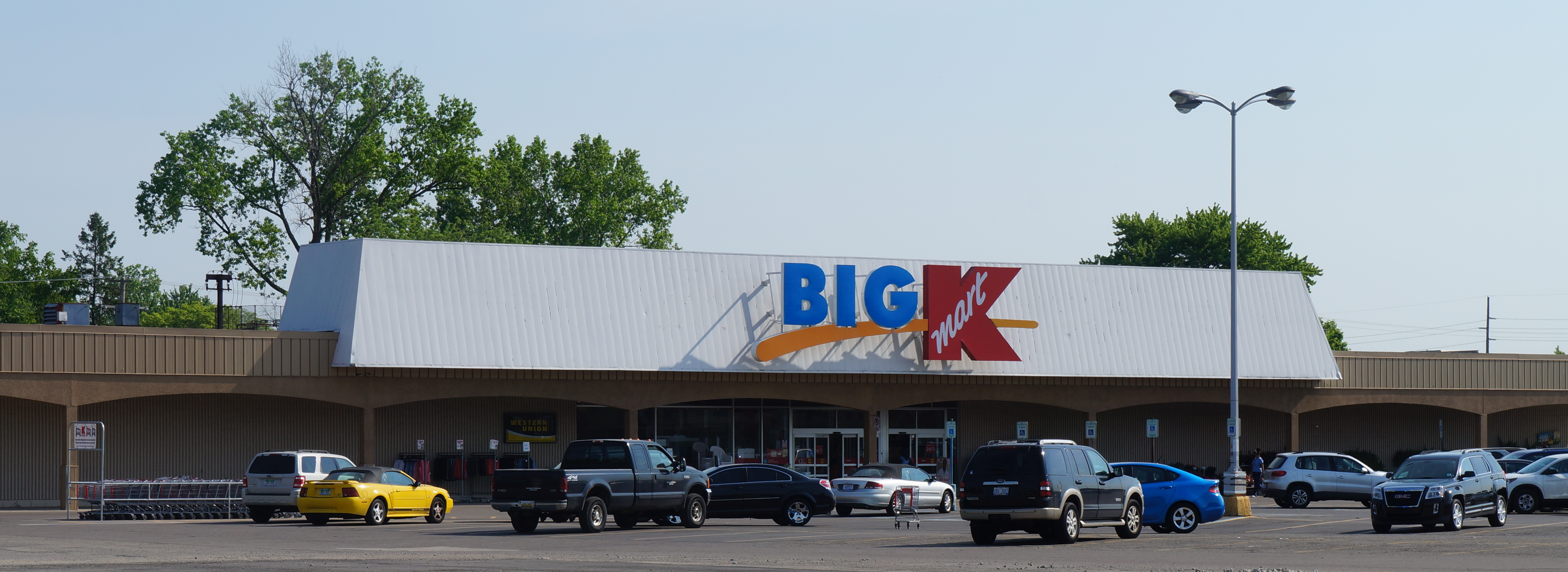
The original Kmart store in Garden City, Michigan (store #4000), which closed in 2017 (pictured in 2016). It was demolished in 2020.

In April 2016, Kmart announced that it was liquidating 68 stores. The chain announced in September 2016 that 64 more stores in 28 states would close by mid-December 2016. Sears Holdings CEO Eddie Lampert stated in October 2016 that there were not and never had been plans to close the Kmart format and that they are working hard to make it a "more fun, engaging place to shop, powered by our integrated retail innovations and Shop Your Way". In December 2016, at least 25 Kmart locations were targeted for closure in early 2017.

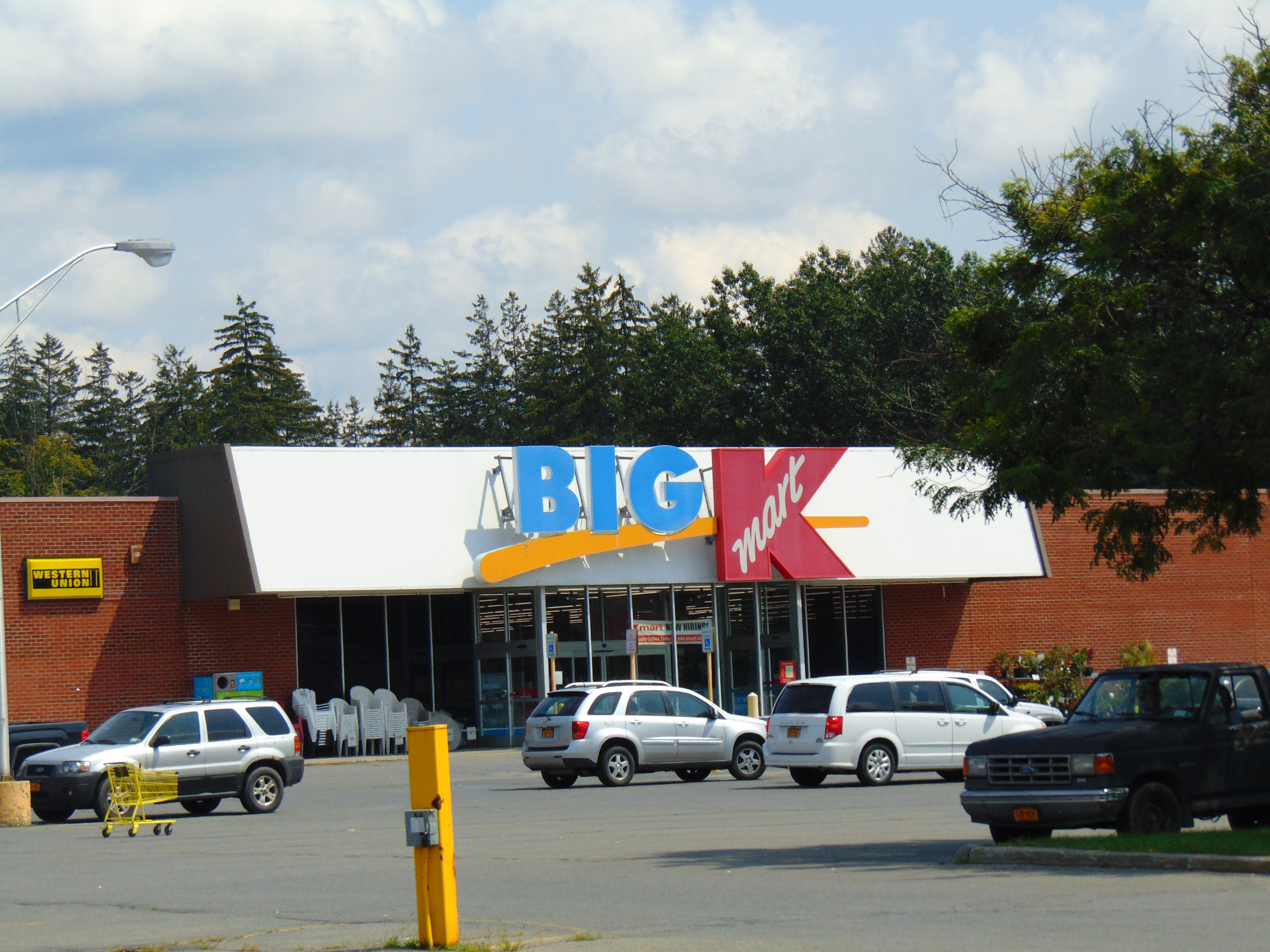
The smaller Big Kmart #9274 was located in Greenwich, New York, in a former Big N in 2017. This store closed in March 2019 along with 79 other Kmart and Sears stores, and became a Big Lots.

In January 2017, Kmart announced that 78 more stores would close. Financial analysts began warning that the fate of Sears Holdings was nearing its end. In May 2017, Kmart announced the upcoming closure of 18 more stores. Sears Holdings admitted uncertainty regarding the survival of both Sears and Kmart. In early June 2017, Kmart announced that an additional 49 stores across the U.S. were to be shuttered by September 2017. In early July 2017, Kmart had announced that 35 more stores would close by early October 2017. In late August 2017, Kmart announced another 28 store closures, including the last Rhode Island location, in Cranston. On October 9, 2017, with no closing sale held, the Kmart store in Santa Rosa, California, was destroyed by the Tubbs Fire, adding to the list of closed stores. On October 17, 2017, Kmart announced the liquidation of an unspecified number of locations by late November. On November 3, 2017, it was announced that a further 45 Kmarts (along with 18 Sears stores) were to close, effective by January 2018, including Kmart's last store in Alabama, in Albertville.

According to Fortune.com, Kmart and Sears did not run any television advertisements during the 2017 holiday season in order to focus on digital marketing after evaluating the effectiveness of its various marketing efforts.

On January 4, 2018, after yet another disappointing holiday sales season, Kmart announced the liquidation of 64 more stores in the spring of 2018. This included Kmart's only remaining Super Kmart location in Warren, Ohio, which officially discontinued the Super Kmart format. According to MSN Money, Kmart along with sister company Sears had an extremely high chance of disappearing in 2018, such that 2017 would have marked its final holiday season as an independent brand.

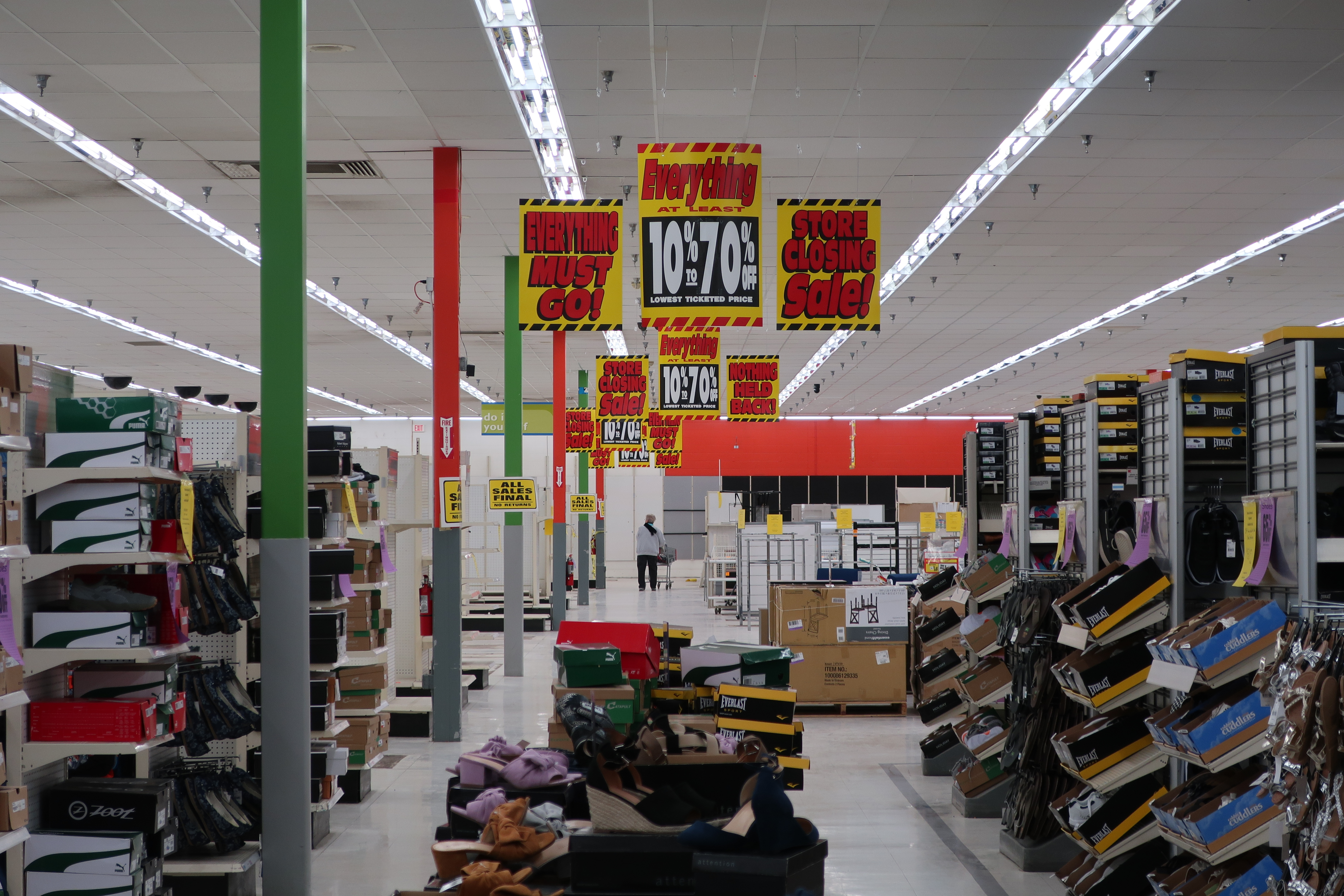
Kmart store closing sale in Gillette, Wyoming (store #4863) in 2018; this location is now Hobby Lobby, Ulta Beauty, Shoe Dept. Encore and Harbor Freight Tools

On March 15, 2018, Sears Holdings announced that a small profit was made in the fourth quarter of 2017. However, investors claimed that it was due to tax refunds and that sales were still falling for both Kmart and Sears. On March 26, 2018, CEO Eddie Lampert said, "I'm not sure Kmart on its own could ever be a great retailer," implying that the company was trying to shift to online shopping as opposed to brick and mortar stores. On April 12, 2018, Sears announced plans to close and auction 16 of its Sears stores, and close several more Kmart locations, but did not specify how many. Two known locations on the list were Kmart stores in Brandon, Florida, and Saugus, Massachusetts. In early May, Sears announced the liquidation of several more Kmarts, including the last Kmart in Vermont, in Bennington.

On May 21, 2018, Sears Holdings announced yet another round of liquidation sales in forty Sears and Kmart stores across 24 states. These stores were closed by July 4, 2018. On May 31, Sears Holdings announced the liquidation of an additional 16 Kmart stores and 48 Sears stores, including the last Kmart in Hawaii, in Līhuʻe. The closings announced May 31, 2018, were from among 100 unprofitable stores in Sears Holdings and the remaining 28 unprofitable stores were, "a small group of stores that was pulled from the closing list ... as they are being evaluated further," meaning even more store closings could occur later in the year. Sears Holdings did not disclose those locations at the time. On June 28, 2018, Sears Holdings disclosed 10 of the stores being evaluated and announced they would close by September 2018. Liquidation sales began on the same day. On July 13, 2018, news came through from multiple sources that even more Kmart stores were set to liquidate across the nation. On August 23, 2018, it was announced that 13 more stores would close by November.

=== 2018–2019: Second bankruptcy ===
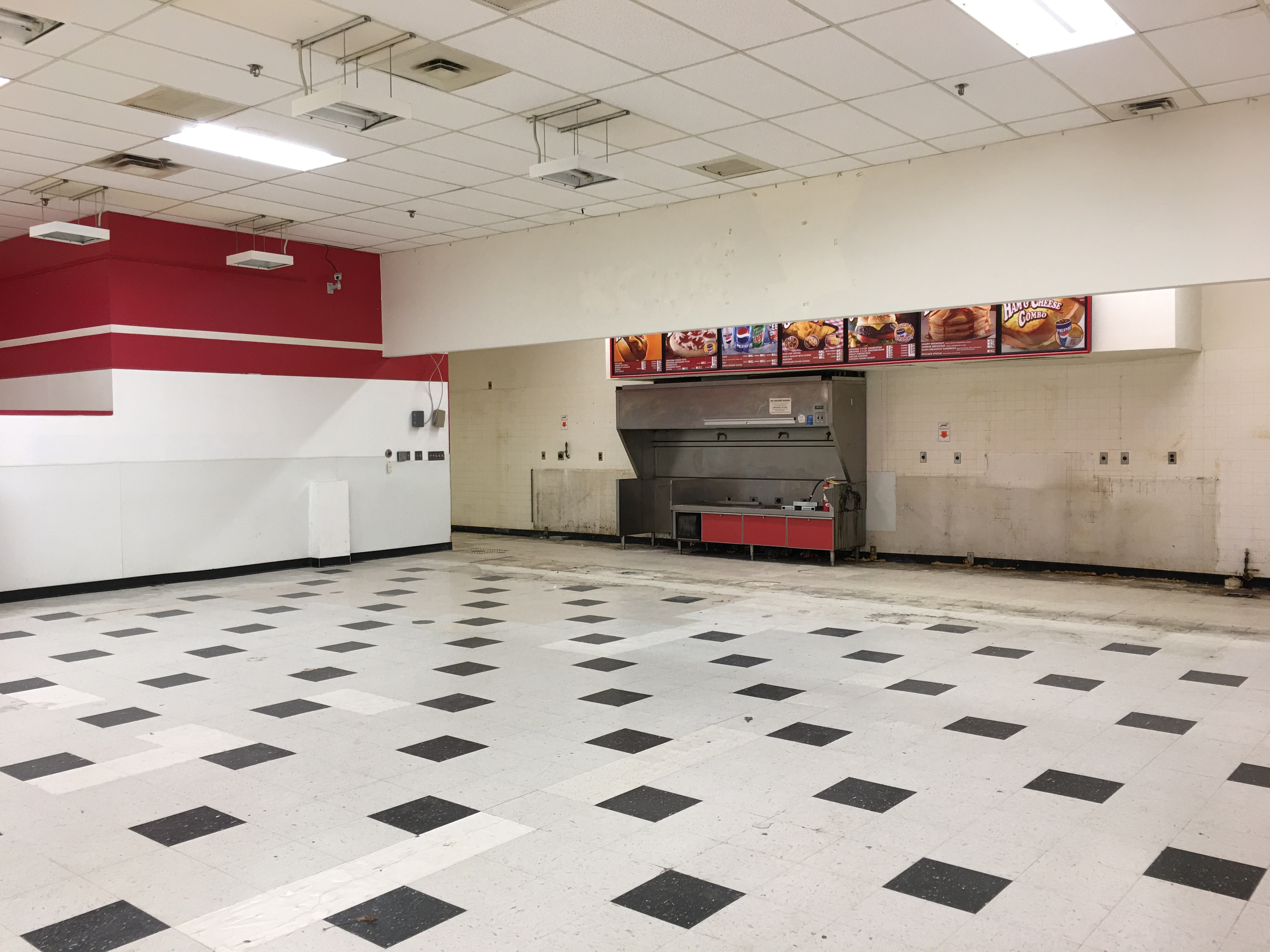
Former Kmart Cafe in the Chesapeake, Virginia Kmart store (store #3471), in a former Robert Hall Village; this store permanently closed on December 15, 2019, it was one of the last two Kmarts in Virginia

On October 15, 2018, Sears Holdings filed Chapter 11 bankruptcy and announced that it would close 142 stores, including 63 Kmart stores, which included the last Kmart in Arkansas, in Russellville, the last two Kmarts in Georgia, in Covington and Peachtree City, and the last two Kmarts in Kansas, in Kansas City and Salina. Sears Holdings' bankruptcy also marked Kmart's second bankruptcy in 16 years. On November 8, 2018, Sears Holdings announced it would close an additional 40 stores, including 11 Kmart stores. On November 23, 2018, Sears Holdings released a list of 505 stores, including 239 Kmart stores, to be presented for sale in the bankruptcy process while all other stores were holding liquidation sales. However, the stores for sale were not guaranteed to be protected from liquidation in the future. On December 28, 2018, Sears Holdings announced it would close 80 additional stores, including 37 Kmart stores.

In a proposal announced in early January, Sears Holdings planned only to keep 202 Kmart stores along with 223 Sears stores open, assuming that it would survive the bankruptcy process. Most of the proposed locations were in highly populated coastal regions.

On January 15, 2019, when it had appeared that Kmart's parent, Sears Holdings, was preparing to file for Chapter 7 liquidation, the bankruptcy court judge ordered the company to return to the negotiating table and work out a new deal with Eddie Lampert to prevent the liquidation from occurring. A new deal was struck at the last minute that would keep up to 400 Sears and Kmart stores operating. On January 19, 2019, Sears Holdings officially announced that they had won the auction, and that some of the then existing stores were to remain open.

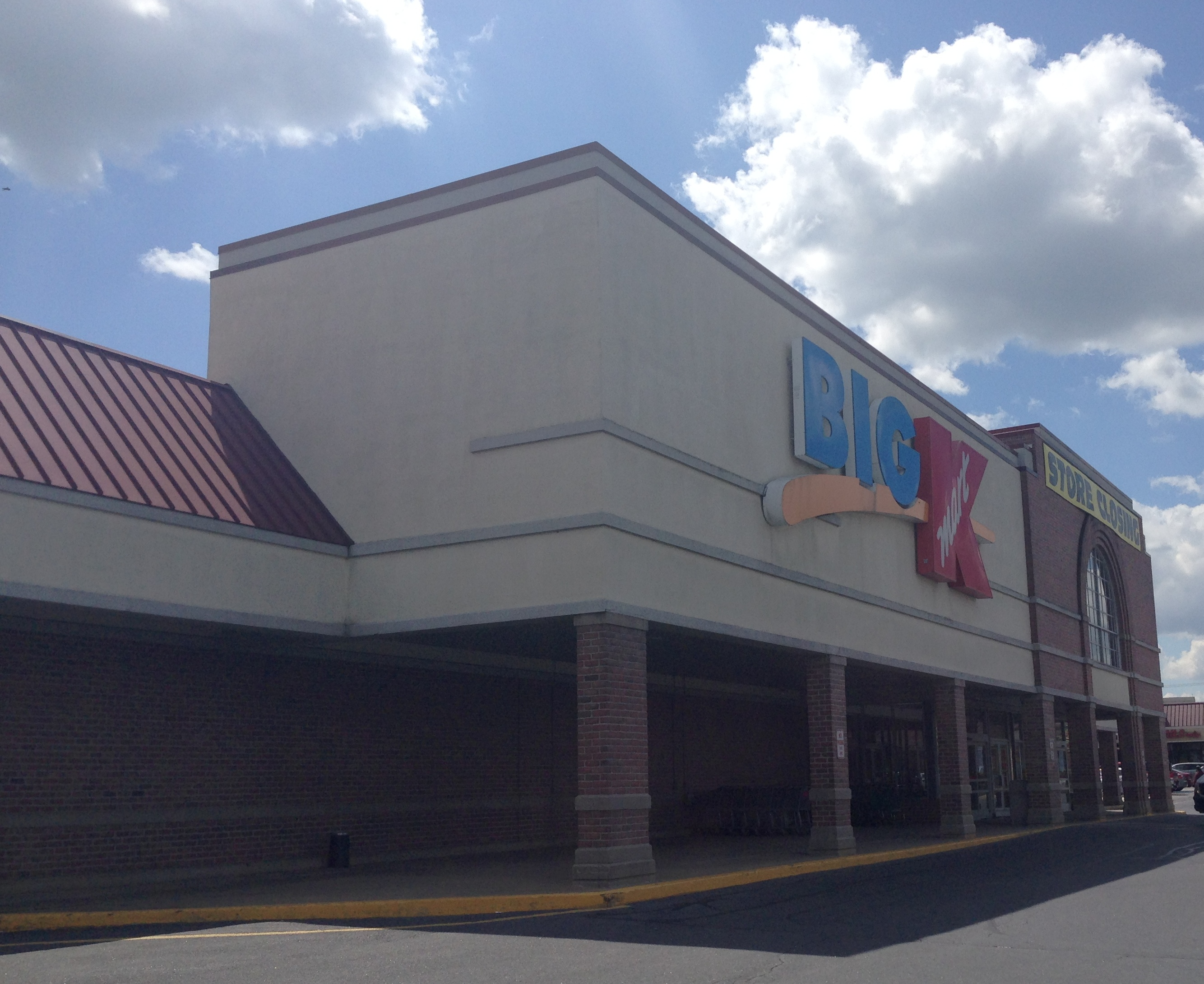
A Big Kmart store in Willow Street, Pennsylvania (store #3810) as it appeared on its last day of operation, April 18, 2021; this was one of the last two Kmart stores in Pennsylvania. This location is now Ocean State Job Lot.

On January 24, 2019, a group of unsecured creditors, which included Simon Property Group, filed a motion with the bankruptcy court to overturn the deal Sears Holdings had recently made with Lampert, claiming Lampert had been "engaged in serial asset stripping" of the company at the expense of suppliers and landlords. The creditors had requested that the bankruptcy court rule to liquidate the company instead of allowing reorganization so that the creditors would be able to recover more money that was still owed to them. On January 28, the federal government-operated Pension Benefit Guaranty Corporation announced that they were not in favor of Sears Holdings' current agreement with Lampert since that agreement would create a $1.7 billion funding gap in the employee pension fund, requiring American taxpayers to cover the shortfall. In papers filed on February 1 with the bankruptcy court, ESL "outlined plans to close three Kmart stores per month in 2019" if the court would decide to accept ESL's purchase bid.

In February 2019, it was announced that a U.S. bankruptcy judge approved the sale of the most lucrative part of Sears Holdings to Edward Lampert, allowing the surviving part of the company to remain in business with a combined number of 425 Kmart and Sears stores, at the expense of suppliers and other creditors. The two sister chains became under the control of a new entity called Transform Holdco also known as Transformco.

=== 2019–present: New management and further store closings ===
The sale of 202 Kmart stores to Transform Holdco was finalized in February 2019, with the remaining Kmart locations liquidated to partially pay off Sears Holdings creditors.

In May 2019, it was revealed that Kmart would close its store in Walla Walla, Washington in July 7 after nearly 45 years of service. On August 6, 2019, during a new announcement of store closings, TransformCo added that it "cannot rule out additional store closures in the near term". In October 2019, the closure of 84 Kmart stores was announced. With another wave of closings announced in November 2019, The Wall Street Journal reported that Transformco "would continue to evaluate its retail footprint, suggesting that additional closures are possible". On February 6, 2020, Kmart announced it would close 15 more stores.

On November 21, 2021, Kmart closed its last store in Michigan, the state where the chain originated in 1962. The store, which opened in the early 1990s as a replacement to an older smaller Kmart outlet, was situated in Marshall, Michigan; the chain's first ever location in Garden City had closed in 2017. On December 18, 2021, Kmart shut down its last West Coast location in Grass Valley, California.

After the closing in March 2022 of the 33 years old Hamilton, Montana store (which still had the pre-1990 logo on its storefront by the time of its shuttering), there were four Kmart locations left in the country, half of them based in New Jersey. On April 16, 2022, Kmart closed down the New Jersey store in Avenel. The other three locations remained opened in Miami, Florida; Westwood, New Jersey; and Bridgehampton, New York. In October 2023, the Westwood location closed after more than 40 years in business, having opened in the fall of 1982. This reduced the chain to two mainland U.S. stores in addition to locations remaining in the US. Virgin Islands and Guam.

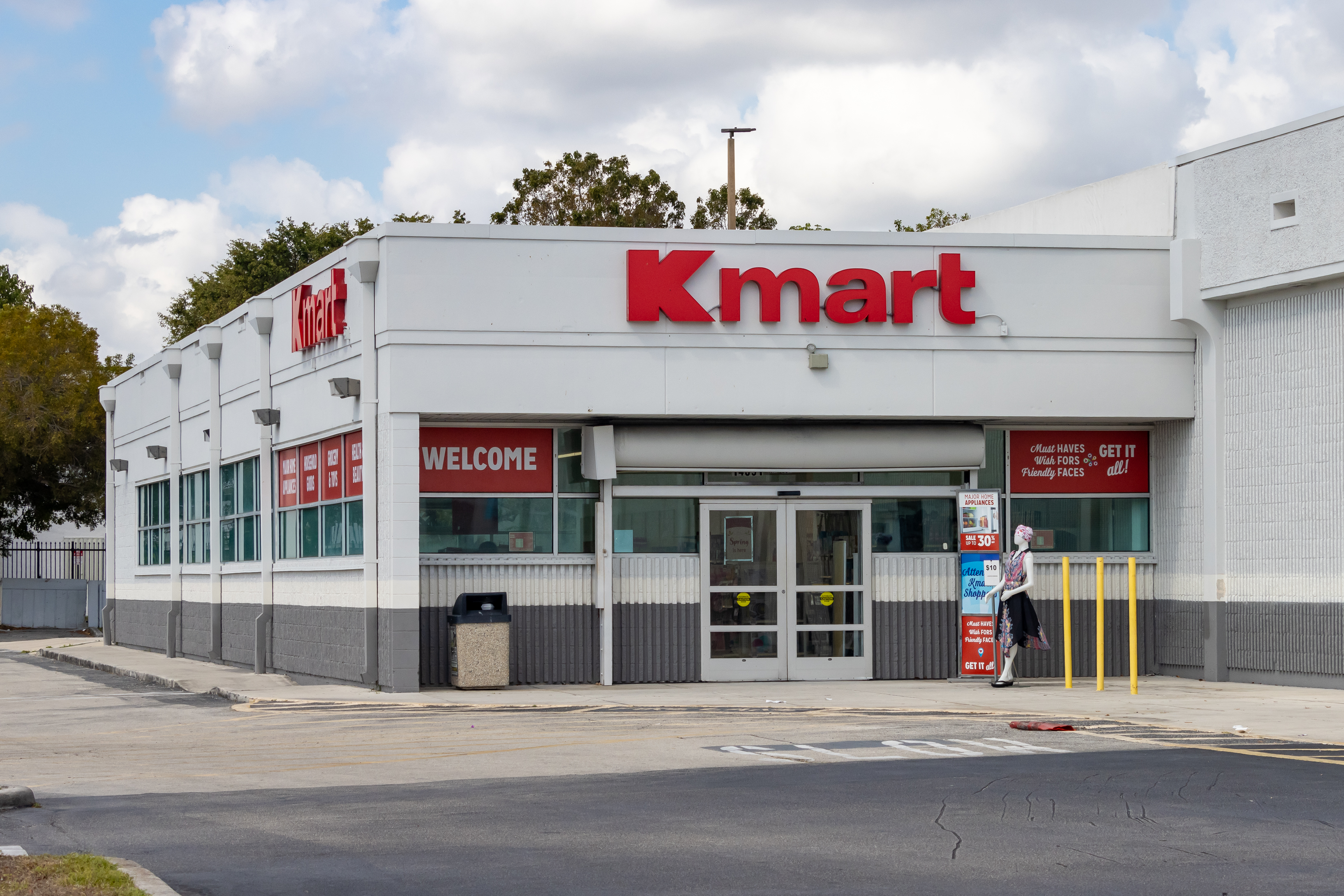
Kmart on Kendall Drive in Miami (store #3074), the last Kmart store in the continental United States—the downsized store occupies the space of its former garden center.

The Bridgehampton, New York location closed on October 20, 2024. It had opened in 1999 in the place of a former Caldor store and was able to outlive other Kmart locations due to limited competition from Walmart and Target which were both a 45-minute drive away. The closure left the Miami store as the sole Kmart location in the continental U.S., with 4 others remaining in U.S. territories. Unlike the location that closed in Bridgehampton, the one in Miami is not a full-line Kmart store. The Kmart location in Miami had been downsized in March 2023. Now the size of a CVS Pharmacy or Walgreens location, the last Kmart store in the United States is operating out of its former garden center, offering a limited selection of clothing, appliances, and household goods. The rest of the store's original space is leased to an At Home outlet. This Kmart store, located in the Kendale Lakes area, inaugurated on November 3, 1977.

In May 2025, it was announced the Kmart store at the Sunny Isle shopping centre in St. Croix, U.S. Virgin Islands would close in August 2025, due to the lease not being renewed. However, its closure came unexpectedly early, shutting down instead on July 5, 2025. It was the last Kmart location in St. Croix. Two years before, the retailer had closed another St-Croix store in Frederiksted, in a shopping mall that had Kmart as a tenant since 1993. In late June 2025, while the Sunny Isle store in St. Croix was still liquidating and its final date approaching, the Virgin Islands Daily News reported that the Kmart location in the Lockhart Gardens shopping center on Saint Thomas would also close on August 16. This leaves chainwide only one location remaining in the Virgin Islands—at the Tutu Park Mall on Saint Thomas, as well as the store in Guam and the small Kmart in Miami.

=== Headquarters ===
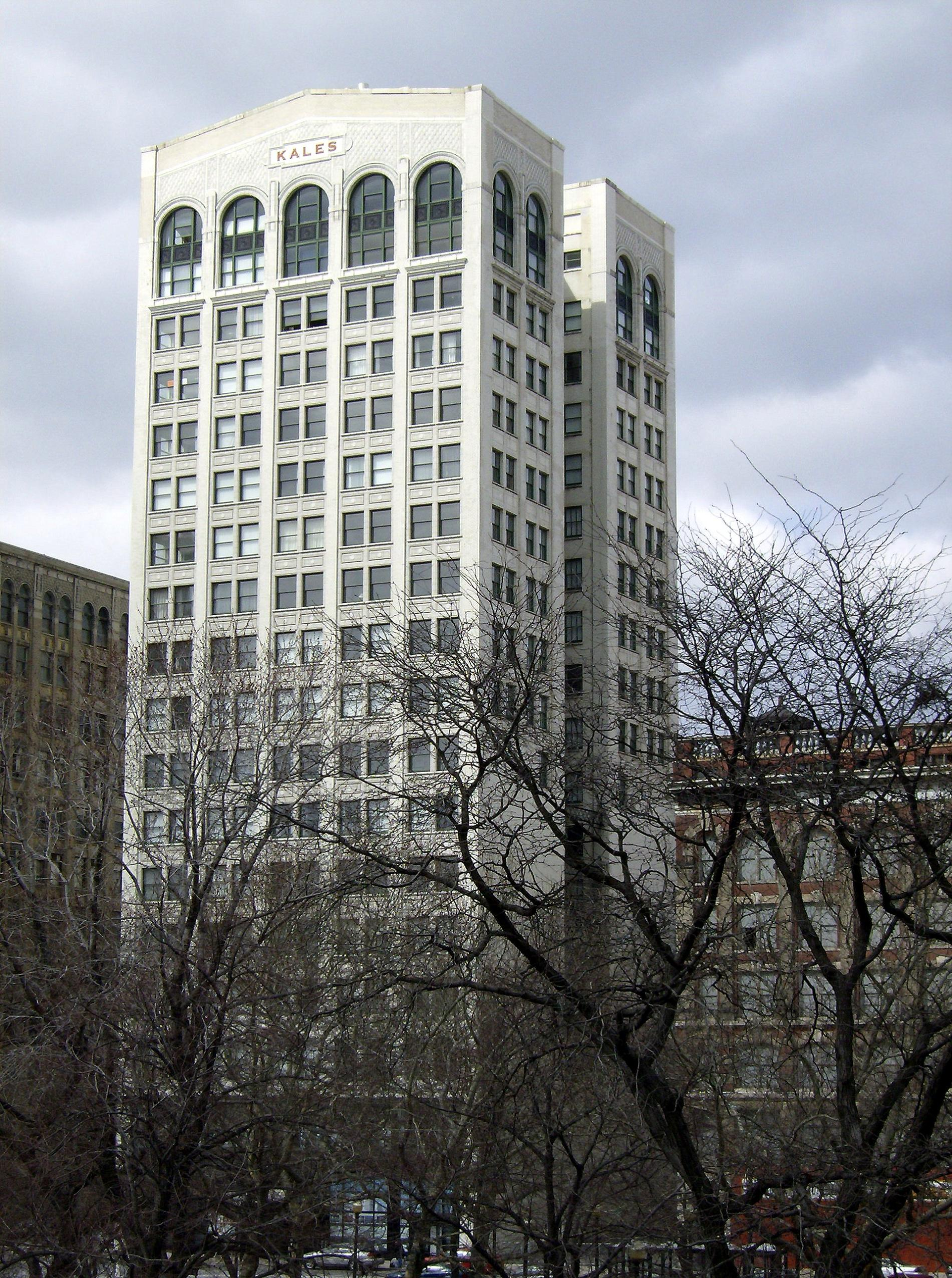
The Kales Building in downtown Detroit as shown in 2007, formerly the S.S. Kresge Co. headquarters from 1914 to 1930

The previous owner of Kmart, Sears Holdings Corporation, had its headquarters on Beverly Road in Hoffman Estates, Illinois. In December 2021, Transformco announced that it intended to put its corporate headquarters for sale at the start of the new year. The company now occupies a different head office in the same city on Trillium Blvd.

The headquarters were formerly located in the Kmart International Headquarters at 3100 W. Big Beaver Road in Troy, Michigan, in Metro Detroit. The facility had 23 interconnected modules. Each had three stories, except for one module, which was one story. Based on the layout, Norm Sinclair of DBusiness concluded that it was "a study in inefficiency".

=== Philanthropy ===
Kmart for Kids was the umbrella program for Kmart's philanthropic initiatives. The program had helped children across the country live happier, healthier lives through the support of: March of Dimes, St. Jude Children's Research Hospital, and American Diabetes Association. At one time, Kmart was March of Dimes' number one corporate sponsor, having raised $114 million for the charity over more than 30 years.

On July 29, 2008, Don Germano, SVP/GM of Kmart stores, was elected to a five-year term on the national Board of Trustees of the March of Dimes Foundation.

Kmart for Kids had supported St. Jude's Children's Research Hospital through its annual Thanks and Giving campaign, an opportunity for Kmart customers to give thanks for the healthy children in their lives and give to help those who are not. Kmart had been a partner of the campaign since 2006, and as of December 2008, had raised more than $59.2 million (equivalent to $88.5 million in 2025) for St. Jude's. A record $21.9 million (equivalent to $30.3 million in 2025) was donated for the tenth annual fundraising campaign during the 2013 holiday season.

In 2008, Kmart earned the "Outstanding Corporate Citizen" Award for its support of the American Diabetes Association's "Step Out: Walk to Fight Diabetes" program. The tribute honored Kmart for the most well-developed, proactive program in the areas of charity, community development, diversity, philanthropy, and associate development. In 2008, Kmart became a national sponsor of "Step Out: Walk to Fight Diabetes" and over the past two years, Kmart's customers and associates have raised approximately $1.5 million (equivalent to $2.4 million in 2025) through its in-store campaigns.

=== Environmental record ===
On May 9, 2007, Kmart was penalized $102,422 (equivalent to $159,000 in 2025) for violations of federal hazardous waste, clean water, emergency planning and preparation regulations at 17 distribution centers. Kmart corrected the violations by preparing and implementing spill-prevention control and countermeasure plans, applying for appropriate storm-water permits, complying with hazardous-waste-generator requirements, and submitting reports to state and local emergency-planning and response organizations informing them of the presence of hazardous substances. The Environmental Protection Agency also accused Kmart of not maintaining adequate information and failing to act in accordance with hazardous-waste-storage and disposal requirements. For instance, the EPA reported having discovered improperly labeled oil-storage drums at a location in Falls, Pennsylvania.

Kmart promoted battery recycling. In 1990, Kmart proposed spending about $80 million (equivalent to $174 million in 2025) on full-page newspaper advertisements offering to recycle junk batteries for $2 (equivalent to $4.00 in 2025) each.

=== Data breaches ===
==== October 2014 ====
In October 2014, Kmart reported that malware was present on some of its in-store payment systems in early September at a number of stores.

==== September 2017 ====
Between September 26 and October 12 of 2017, malware were installed in the computers operated by a service provider that provided service for sears.com and kmart.com ecommerce sites in which the credit card information of 100,000 customers were exposed via a malicious script. The breech was not publicly announced until April 2024.

==== June 2018 incident ====
In June 2018, Sears Holdings reported that hackers were able to steal credit card numbers at several Kmart stores by accessing the store payment systems by a "viruslike computer code" that was undetectable by then current anti-virus systems.

==== June 2021 ====
An unauthorized party accessed Transformco computer servers between June 3, 2021, and June 15, 2021, that held employee payroll and healthcare information that affected current and past Kmart and other Transformco employees.

=== Animal welfare concerns ===
In 2012, Mercy for Animals, a non-profit organization working against cruelty to farmed animals, conducted an investigation at Christensen Farms, a pork supplier to Kmart, Walmart and Costco, obtaining hidden-camera footage of pigs confined in small gestation crates and cruelty to piglets. In response, Kmart announced it would begin requiring its pork suppliers to phase out gestation crates.

=== Racing sponsorships ===
Kmart was a prominent sponsor in NASCAR and the now-defunct CART series. The retailer was a longtime sponsor of Newman/Haas Racing, owned by actor Paul Newman and former racer Carl Haas. Its CART drivers included Nigel Mansell and the father-son duo of Michael and Mario Andretti. Michael Andretti and Mansell won championships under Kmart sponsorship in 1991 and 1993, respectively. When Michael Andretti moved to Formula One in 1993, Kmart sponsored his McLaren for the season. The company also sponsored the NASCAR-sanctioned Kmart 400 at Michigan International Speedway and North Carolina Speedway. Lake Speed garnered Kmart's first win in NASCAR in 1988 at the Darlington Raceway. Kmart sponsored three-time champion Darrell Waltrip in 1999 and 2000 during his last two full-time seasons. Most recently, in NASCAR, the company sponsored Boris Said's #60 No Fear Ford Fusion in 2006.

=== Operations in Puerto Rico ===
On November 25, 1959, the S. S. Kresge chain expanded with the opening of its first store in Puerto Rico, a 17,678 square-foot unit at the 65th Infantry shopping center in San Juan, the capital city of the island. More Kresge stores would go on to open on the island in the 1960s, such as the Santa Rosa Plaza store in Bayamón in February 1960, the Norte shopping center store in Santurce in March 1962, the Centro del Sur shopping center store in Ponce in June 1962, and the Reparto Metropolitano shopping center store in Río Piedras in February 1965. In June 1987, Kresge stores in Puerto Rico would begin to cease operations with the closure of the Centro del Sur store that month, and another store also in Ponce.

On October 21, 1964, the Kmart chain also expanded beyond the contiguous United States, opening a 69,000 square-foot unit at the San Patricio Plaza shopping center in Guaynabo. On December 31, 1967, a fire would consume the building where the Kmart was located at the San Patricio Plaza shopping center leaving it completely destroyed. The fire, which caused an estimated loss of $1.5 million, was started in some boxes and sheets of cardboard partitioning walls behind the store outside the building. On January 30, 1969, the destroyed Kmart store, after being re-built, would re-inaugurate at the shopping center.

On May 3, 1979, a new Kmart store would open in the town of Trujillo Alto on the island. The new store, of 84,180 square-feet, was the chain's third in Puerto Rico, and increased the total number of Kmart stores to 1,532 located in the United States and Canada.

On May 28, 1983, the Kmart Corporation had completed the acquisition of five lease contracts for stores previously operated by the Barker's chain on the Island, and hoped to reopen them by September or October of that year. Kmart had paid approximately $2.1 million to obtain the leases for these stores. The Barker's chain had closed 16 stores it had in Puerto Rico earlier that year due to financial problems of its parent company, KDT Industries. KDT had filed for bankruptcy and began auctioning the leases of the Barker's stores that had closed. Three new Kmart stores would open in October of that year on the island, two stores in Bayamón at the Plaza Río Hondo shopping mall and the Rexville Plaza shopping center, and one in Arecibo at the Plaza del Atlántico shopping mall. This would increase the number of people Kmart employed on the Island to more than 700 in the 12 stores it now had, which included six Kmart stores and six Kresge stores.

On April 23, 1998, it was reported that the Kmart chain would be investing more than $25 million on the Island before the end of the year to convert eight of its 21 stores at the time into Big Kmart stores and that two new stores would be opening, one in Vega Alta and another in the Plaza Las Américas shopping mall. James Mesenbring, Kmart regional manager for Puerto Rico and the Caribbean, said that four new Big Kmart stores would be inaugurated, located at the Montehiedra Town Center, Los Colobos shopping center in Carolina, and the Plaza Guayama shopping mall and in Cayey. These joined the Big Kmart stores that already operated at the San Patricio Plaza and in the Las Catalinas Mall in Caguas. In July of that year, the stores in Vega Baja, Bayamón (Plaza Río Hondo), Caguas (Rafael Cordero Avenue) and Trujillo Alto would also be converted. Meanwhile, in August of that year, they planned to open the Big Kmart in Vega Alta at a cost of $10 million, and in November they would inaugurate the two-level store in Plaza Las Américas, which would be the chain's largest store on the Island with 144,000 square-feet of space.

Between 2002 and 2003, three Kmart stores on the island closed due to the bankruptcy, one in Humacao in 2002, one in 2003 at the Juncos Plaza shopping center in Juncos, and another store in Cayey that same year.

In 2011, the Kmart chain opened a new smaller store concept at 8,000 square-feet named "Kmart Express" at the Plaza Carolina shopping mall in Carolina, this was short lived. Through the 2010s and beyond the Kmart chain began to downsize in Puerto Rico with various closures. In 2015, two Kmart stores closed, one at the Señorial Plaza in San Juan, and one in Vega Baja. In December 2018, three Kmart stores announced their closure, the San Patricio Plaza store, the Las Catalinas Mall store, and one in the town of San Germán. In August 2019, five more Kmart stores announced their closure, located in Aguadilla, Trujillo Alto, Cayey, Carolina, and Yauco. In November 2019, another five Kmart stores announced their closure, located in Fajardo, Juana Díaz, Arecibo, Plaza Río Hondo, and Vega Alta. In January 2020 another store located at the Plaza Centro Mall in Caguas announced its closure. In June 2020, two more Kmart stores were announced to be closing, one located at Plaza Guaynabo shopping mall in Guaynabo, and one in Ponce. And in December 2020, two more Kmart stores announced their closure, located in the Rexville Town Center in Bayamón, and the Western Plaza in Mayagüez. On October 15, 2022, after being the only store in the chain left open on the island since 2021, the Plaza las Américas Kmart store announced it was closing permanently, with Kmart entirely ceasing operations in Puerto Rico. Owners of the mall had reportedly been negotiating for Kmart to vacate the building for a new tenant for months, and finally Kmart agreed to move out by that October.

=== Operation in Guam ===
Kmart has its Guam location in Tamuning. The Kmart in Guam caters to American customers and tourists from Asian countries. The store opened in May 1995 and has a size of 170,000 square feet. As of 2018 the Guam store sold $100,000,000 worth of goods per year, the highest of any existing Kmart at the time, and had the highest customer count of any Kmart store. Because of its distance from competition and a lack of online shopping options in Guam, Lucy Craymer of the Wall Street Journal wrote that the Guam Kmart was in "a retail version of the Galapagos."

== Subsidiaries ==
=== Current ===
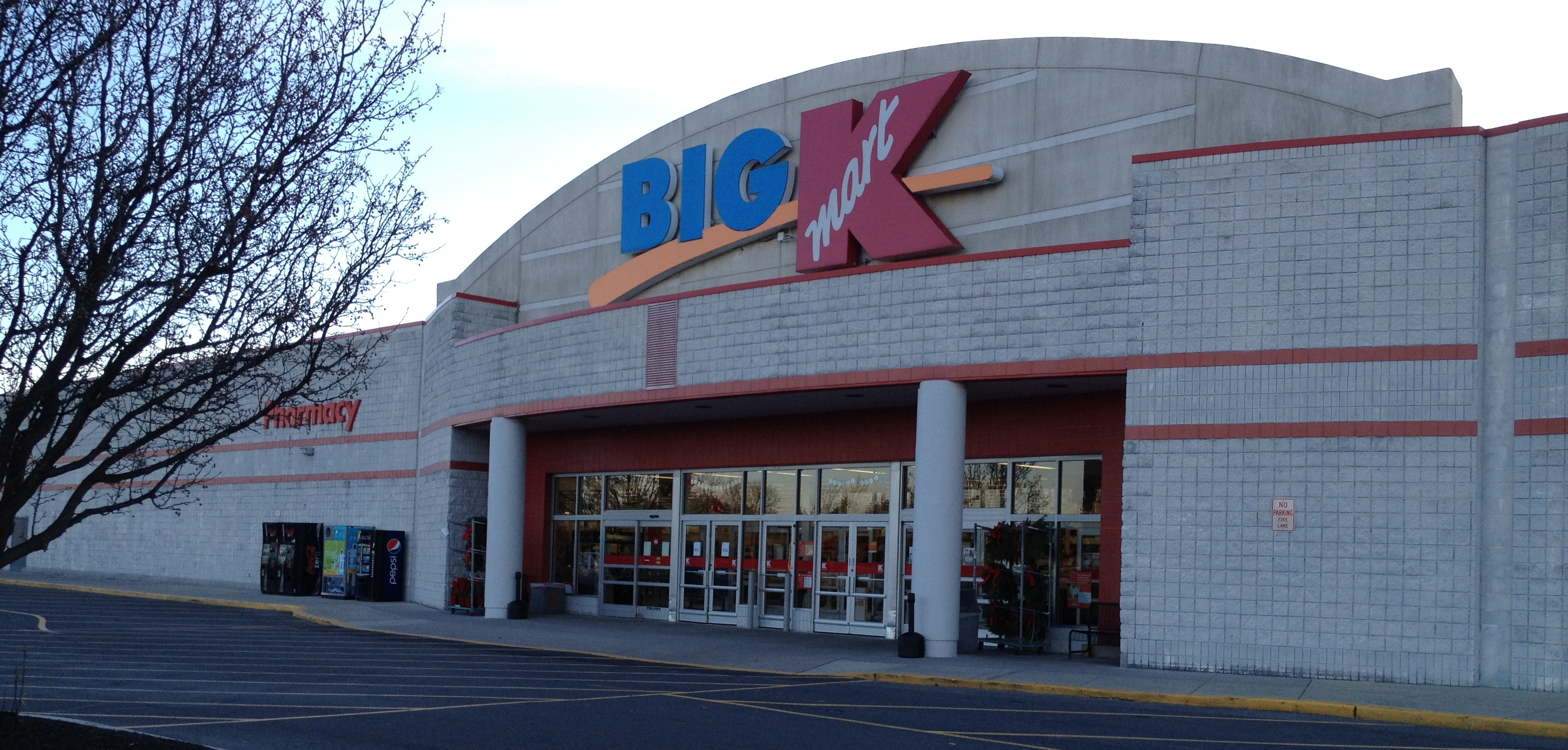
Big Kmart store in Carlisle, Pennsylvania (store #7746), December 2012—it was later converted into a regular Kmart with the current logo. This store closed in December 2018, along with 141 other Kmart and Sears stores. This location is now a U-Haul.

- Kmart is a chain of discount department stores that are usually free-standing or located in strip malls. They carry compact discs (CDs), DVDs, TV shows on DVD, electronics, bedding, household hardware, sporting goods, clothing, toys, jewelry, office supplies, health and beauty products, over-the-counter medications, home decor, and a limited selection of food items. Many also once held garden centers, Jackson Hewitt tax centers, pharmacies, and/or a K-Cafe or delicatessen. Kmart stores range from 80,000–110,000 sq ft (7,400–10,200 m^{2}). Before the mass closures, most of them were either converted to or rebranded as Big Kmart while some were converted into Super Kmart stores.

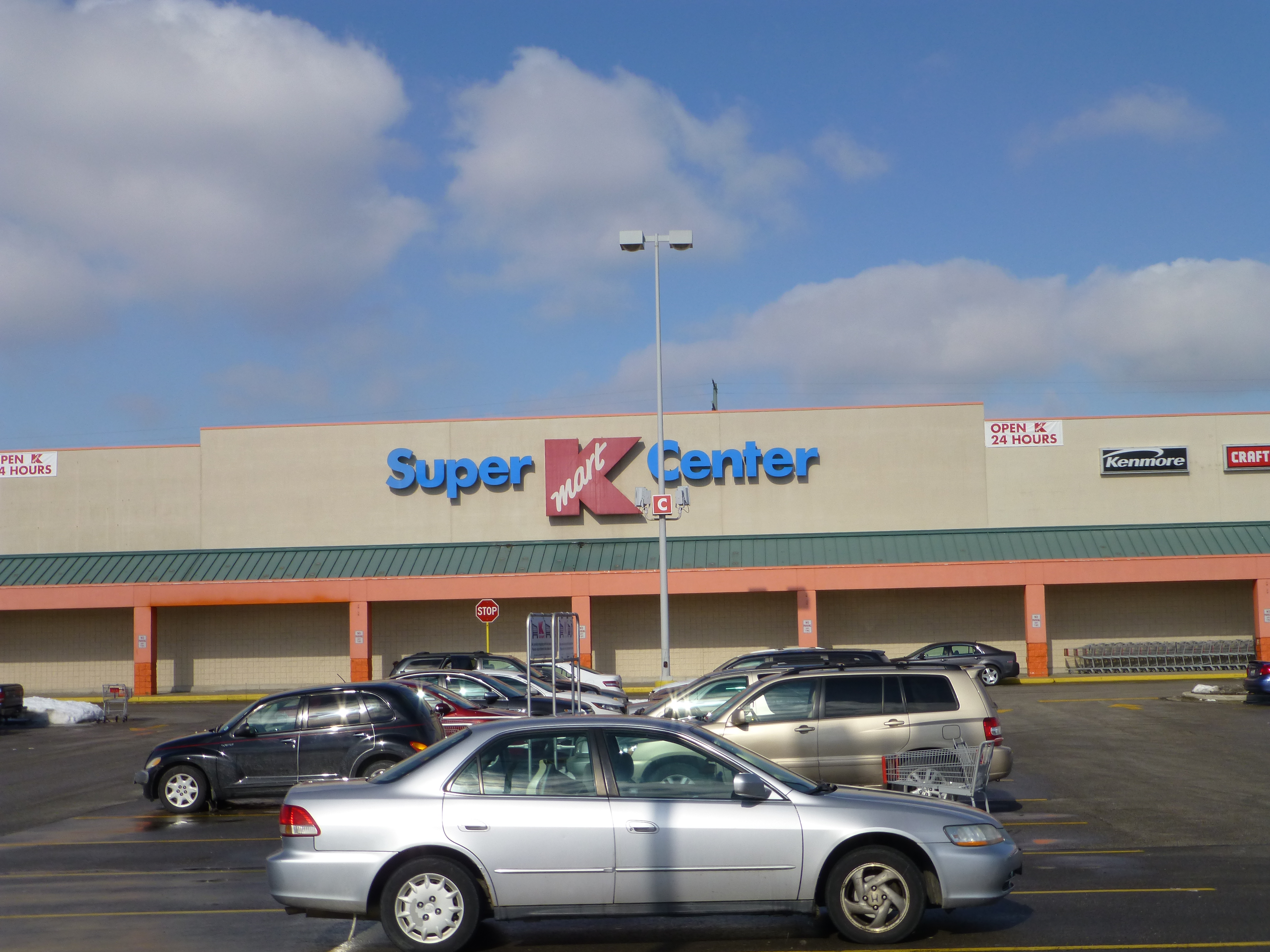
A Super Kmart Center store in Lorain, Ohio (store #3910), in February 2013—this store closed on September 18, 2016. This location was demolished and is now a Meijer.

=== Former ===
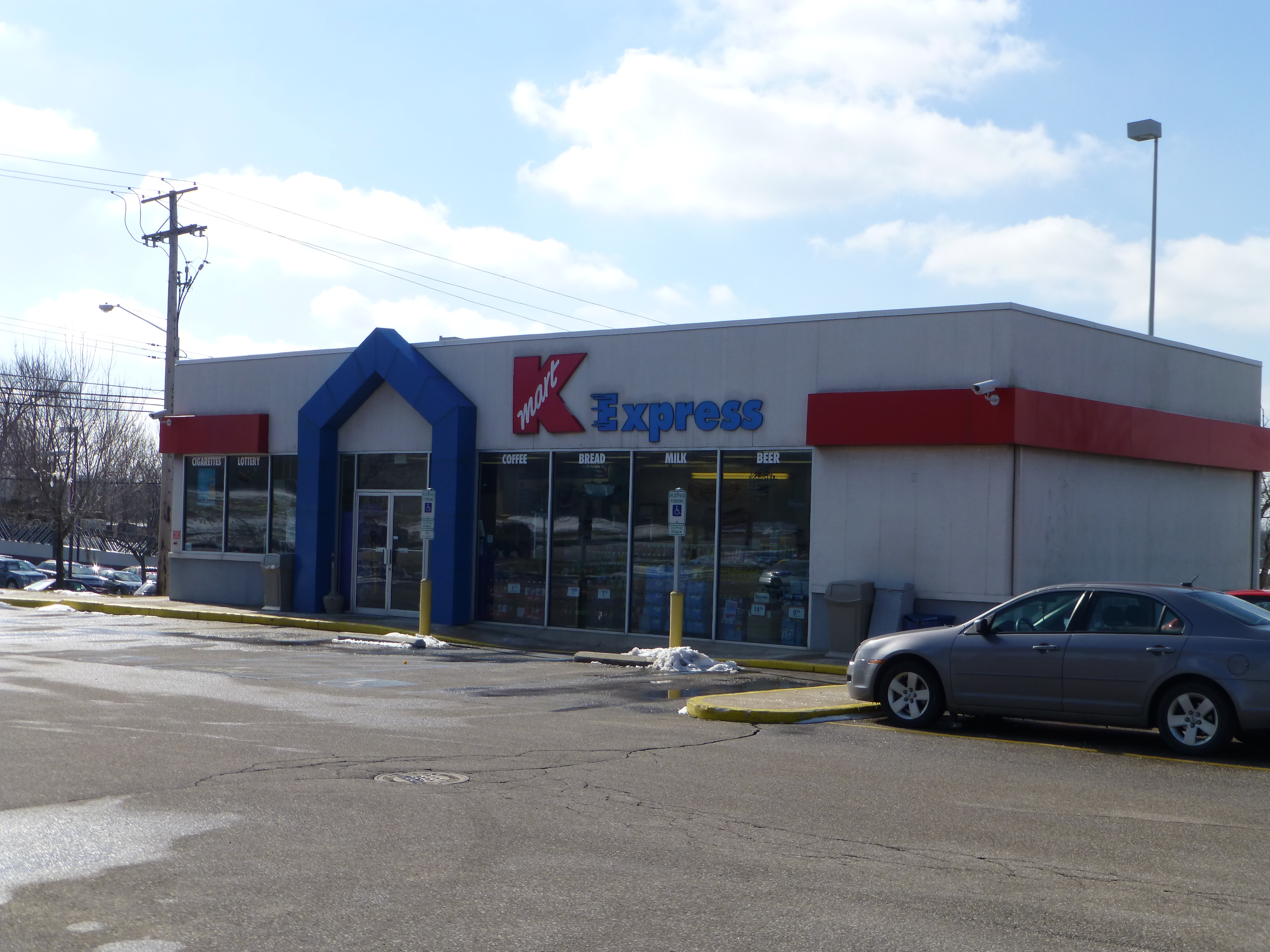
A Kmart Express gas station in Cleveland, Ohio, in February 2013. The Super Kmart (store #4966) near it, as well as this Kmart Express, closed in 2014; these buildings were demolished, and the location is now a Menards.

- American Fare was a chain of hypermarkets that operated from 1989 to 1994. It was a joint venture involving Kmart, which owned 51 percent of the store, and Birmingham, Alabama-based Bruno's Supermarkets, which owned 49 percent of the stores. The first store opened in Stone Mountain, Georgia, near Atlanta, on January 29, 1989. American Fare's 244,000 sq ft (22,700 m^{2}) of retail space included 74,550 sq ft (6,926 m^{2}) of groceries, 104,000 sq ft (9,700 m^{2}) of general merchandise, and 35,000 sq ft (3,300 m^{2}) of clothing (including apparel, footwear, and accessories). An area in the front of the store housed a music and video store, a food court (including a Taco Bell and TCBY), bank, hair salon, pharmacy and a card store. Charlotte, North Carolina, was home to the second American Fare, which opened on April 1, 1990, with 160,000 sq ft (15,000 m^{2}) of retail space. A third and final store opened in Jackson, Mississippi in August 1990, with plans for a fourth store in Birmingham, Alabama never coming to fruition. In June 1992, Bruno's announced the termination of its partnership with the Kmart Corporation, and that Kmart would assume ownership of the three stores. The three stores closed by May 1994. The Stone Mountain store would be split into two parcels, a Kmart and a Cub Foods store. The building now houses the DeKalb County Board of Education. The Charlotte store was converted to Super Kmart, then a Steve & Barry's, before closing in 2009. It now houses a Verizon call center, and the Jackson store's parking lot became a Carmax in 2007, while the building itself is now owned by Comcast. The American Fare brand is used on some Kmart store-brand consumable products.
- Big Kmart was a chain of discount department stores that carried everything a regular Kmart carries, but emphasizes home decor, children's clothing, and more food items such as meat and poultry, baked goods, frozen foods and an extended, but limited section of garden produce. Big Kmart stores ranged from 84,000 to 120,000 sq ft (7,800 to 11,100 m^{2}). Big Kmart stores also featured a garden center, a pharmacy, a branch of a local bank, a Jackson Hewitt tax center, an Olan Mills portrait studio, an arcade, a K-Café or Little Caesars Pizza Station, and sometimes a Kmart Express gas station. As noted above, Kmart introduced the Big Kmart brand company-wide when it was introduced in 1997. However in early 2001, Kmart shifted away the Big Kmart brand. Some Big Kmart locations were either closed or converted to normal Kmart stores. The final Big Kmart store in Marshall, Michigan closed permanently on November 21, 2021.
- BlueLight Internet service. In 1999 Kmart began offering a dial-up Internet service called BlueLight, which was eventually spun off as an independent company. BlueLight was initially free and supported by banner ads. BlueLight began limiting the free service in January 2001 and was reacquired by Kmart in July 2001, the same month it announced the end of the free service. In 2002 United Online, which also owns NetZero and Juno, bought the BlueLight service after Kmart filed for bankruptcy. In August 2006, Bluelight dropped the banners. In August 2006, the service cost $14.95 a month and had around 165,000 subscribers.
- Borders was a chain of bookstores acquired by Kmart in 1992. In 1994, Borders merged with the Kmart chain Waldenbooks to form Borders-Walden Group, which was sold in 1995. In February 2011, Borders filed for Chapter 11 bankruptcy and announced plans to liquidate in July after failing to find a buyer to keep the chain's remaining 399 stores in operation. The remaining stores closed in September.
- Builders Square was a home improvement superstore. In 1997, it was sold to Hechinger, which went out of business in 1999.
- Designer Depot: A discount clothing store chain operated in Metro Detroit in the 1980s. The first opened in a former S. S. Kresge dime store in St. Clair Shores, Michigan in 1982, selling brand names such as Yves Saint Laurent, Izod Lacoste, and Calvin Klein at discount prices.
- K-Café was an in-store restaurant that served a fairly standard menu of hamburgers, hot dogs, French fries, grilled cheese sandwiches and Philly cheesesteaks. They also offered a full breakfast menu of baked goods, bagels and egg platters with bacon or sausage, and such snacks as nachos, pretzels, popcorn and ice cream. Hot food items could also be purchased at the deli and eaten in the Deli Café at Super Kmart Center stores. However, K-Café has been discontinued in all of their stores.
- KDollar was a chain of discount stores/dollar stores that sold Kmart merchandise at a discount. The stores were often former Kmart or Big Kmart stores. Sears Brands filed for a trademark on the KDollar name on November 6, 2012. The first opened in a former regular Kmart store in Bloomfield Hills, Michigan in 2013. A second KDollar store opened in Waukegan, Illinois.
- Kmart Chef restaurants were a small chain of free-standing fast-food restaurants owned by Kmart, started in 1967 with the first location on the parking lot of a Kmart in Pontiac, Michigan. The "limited, high-turnover menu" (as Kmart founder S.S. Kresge put it) consisted of hamburgers, French fries, hot dogs, and soft drinks. The Kmart Chef chain folded in 1974 after peaking at 11 locations.
- Kmart Dental was an in-store dental office located in Kmart stores. There was only one such prototype in a Kmart store, in Miami, Florida. Despite the name, Kmart Dental was never technically owned by Kmart.
- Kmart Express was a chain of gas stations/convenience stores located in out-parcels at some Kmart and Super Kmart stores, particularly in the Midwest. In the early 2000s, there were plans to expand this concept to most Kmarts, but the plan for more locations was canceled after Kmart's bankruptcy in 2002. The final Kmart Express, in Ionia, MI, closed in 2017.
- Kmart Food Stores was a supermarket chain founded in 1962. Most Kmart Food locations were paired with Kmart stores, often operated by a local grocery chain but always branded as Kmart Food. The chain was discontinued in the early 1980s.
- Kwash was an attached-to-store laundromat launched in May 2010. Only one such prototype existed. It was in a former auto bay in Iowa City, Iowa. It featured a separate entrance, laundromat attendants and free wi-fi along with a limited selection of laundry goods available for purchase. The Kwash closed along with the Kmart in 2017.
- Makro, a Dutch warehouse club chain, operated locations in the U.S. from February 1981 to 1989, in Atlanta, Philadelphia, and the Washington, D.C. suburb of Largo, Maryland. Kmart bought the chain's entire American holdings in 1989, having owned a 49 percent share before. The Makro stores were later converted to Pace or closed in 1990.
- Office Square was a chain selling office supplies and office furniture which was a spin-off of Builders Square. In 1991, OfficeMax was acquired by Kmart and Office Square was merged into OfficeMax stores.
- OfficeMax is a chain selling office supplies and office furniture which was acquired in 1991 and sold in 1995. It was acquired by Office Depot in 2013.
- Pace Membership Warehouse was Kmart's warehouse club brand, until the chain was purchased by Walmart. In 1993, Walmart converted most of the stores into its Sam's Club brand, and sold others to chains such as Bradlees.
- PayLess Drugs was a chain of drug stores acquired by Kmart in 1985 and later sold to TCH Corporation in 1994. The resulting entity, Thrifty PayLess, was acquired by Rite Aid in 1996, which converted all of the PayLess and Thrifty stores into Rite Aid stores in 1999. The PayLess division also owned Bi-Mart, which was spun off along with sister stores such as Pay 'n Save.
- The Sports Authority was a chain of sporting goods stores which was acquired in 1990 and sold in 1995. The Sports Authority went out of business in 2016.
- Super Kmart Center (also known as Super Kmart) was a chain of superstores that carried everything a regular Kmart carries, but also had a full grocery section with meat and poultry, baked goods, a delicatessen, garden produce, and fresh seafood. Super Kmart Centers ranged from 140,000 to 190,000 sq ft (13,000 to 18,000 m^{2}). The first store opened in Medina, Ohio on July 25, 1991, which downsized to a regular Kmart before closing for good in 2012. Super Kmart stores also featured a garden center, a video rental store, a branch of a local bank, an arcade, a portrait studio, a Jackson Hewitt tax center, a pharmacy, and usually a deli café or Little Caesars Pizza Station. Many of these services were closed and discontinued in recent years. Several locations also included Kmart Express gas stations, and most had an auto center. Most Super Kmarts were closed during the two rounds of closures in 2002 and 2003, and many had their groceries removed, converting them into regular Kmart locations. A typical Super Center sold around $30 million of merchandise during one fiscal year. In 2015, some stores were converted into a regular Kmart with a concept titled K-Fresh. These stores feature an expanded pantry and a fresh-food department, though these types of items are no longer prepared on-site and are now prepackaged. The deli, butcher and bakery operations were also closed. Kmart gradually closed its Super Kmart stores; the last location was in Warren, Ohio and closed on April 8, 2018. It was replaced by Meijer.
- U-Pak was a single "no-frills" supermarket which sold items out of boxes instead of on shelves, and featured reduced hours. It opened adjacent to a Kmart on Opdyke Boulevard in Pontiac, Michigan in 1979 and closed less than a month later due to poor sales.
- Variety Outlet. A closeout chain, typically operated out of closed Kmart stores. The first opened in Rome, Georgia in 1994.
- Waldenbooks was a chain consisting primarily of shopping-mall–based book stores which was acquired in 1984. In 1994, Kmart chain Borders merged with Waldenbooks to form Borders-Walden Group, which was sold in 1995 (the company was subsequently renamed Borders Group, and went out of business in 2011 due to bankruptcy).

== International ==
=== Australia and New Zealand ===
Kmart Australia logo

The first Kmart store in Australia opened in 1969 in Burwood East, Victoria; the site was renovated in 2010 to be a shopping mall known as Burwood One.

Kmart Australia was born out of a joint venture between G.J. Coles & Coy Limited (Coles) and the S.S. Kresge Company (Kresge), with Kresge owning 51% of the common stock in the company and the remaining 49% being owned by Coles. The first New Zealand store opened in Henderson, a suburb of Auckland, in 1988. Kresge later exited this partnership in 1994 selling their ownership in the company to Coles Myer, the successor to G. J. Coles & Coy Limited. Since the dissolution of Coles Myer in 2007, the Australian and New Zealand Kmart stores are owned by Wesfarmers.

=== Canada ===
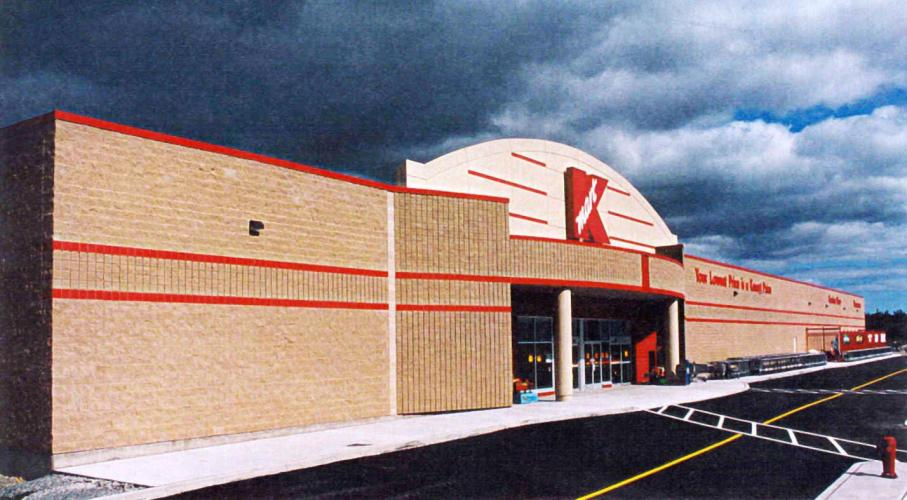
Former Kmart store in Bayers Lake, Nova Scotia (Store #5551) shown in 1994; now Canadian Tire

Kmart opened their first store in Canada in Huron Heights, Ontario on March 14, 1963, followed by a second location in Windsor, Ontario on May 9, 1963.

Kmart closed five stores in Greater Montreal in 1983–84. Kresge ceased to exist in Canada in 1994. In December 1997, it was announced that ten of the existing 122 stores were to be closed. However, as a result of Kmart's ongoing financial difficulties, the Canadian division comprising 112 stores was sold to competitor Zellers of the Hudson's Bay Company in May 1998, after which the stores were either closed or converted to Hudson's Bay Company brands, mostly Zellers.

==== Slogans ====
- The Saving Place 1960s–1990
- Your Lowest Price is a Kmart Price 1990–1998

=== Caribbean ===
In the early 2000s, Kmart tried to expand into Caribbean countries where Wal-Mart and Target had no presence, but ultimately none of the proposed stores advanced beyond the construction stage and none opened by the time Kmart filed for bankruptcy in 2002 when it stopped paying its construction contractors.

Kmart started construction of a Super Kmart in 2001 in Trinidad, but halted it in 2002 when the store was 80 percent complete. There were plans for more stores to be built in Trinidad, as well as in Millennium Heights in Barbados, five stores in the Dominican Republic, and a potential foray into Jamaica.

=== Europe ===
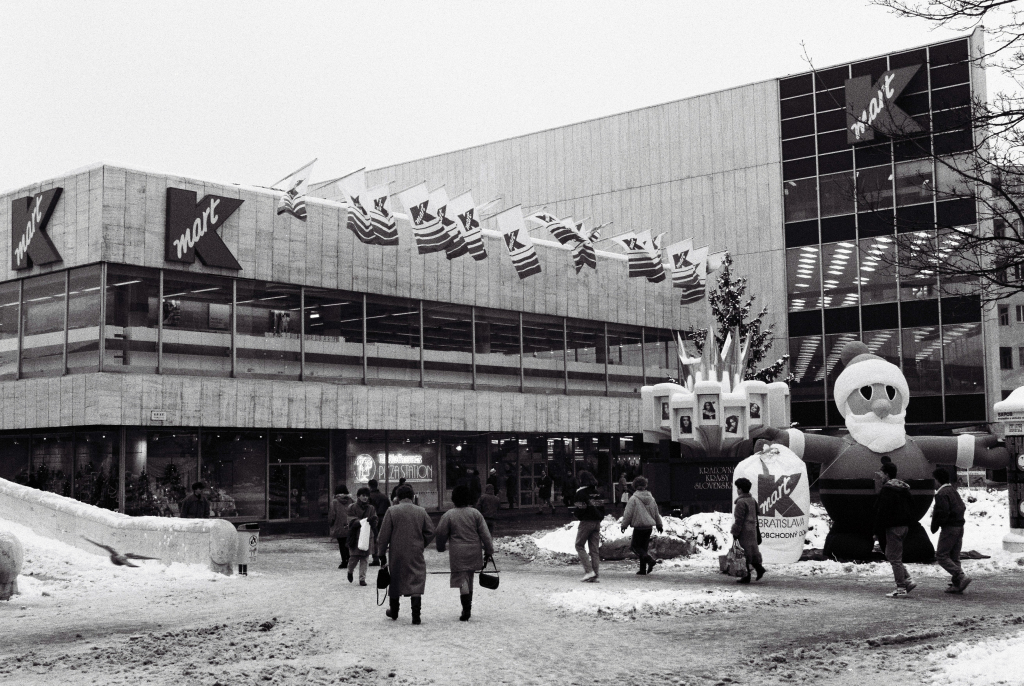
Kmart in Bratislava, Slovakia, during the early 1990s; this location is now a Tesco

In 1992, Kmart purchased several communist-era department stores in Eastern Europe, including 13 in the former Czechoslovakia that were bought from the former Czechoslovak government. Many of these outlets were quite profitable, with the Bratislava location setting a single-store sales record for the company. In March 1996, due to its troubles in the U.S., the Kmart Corporation announced that it had agreed to sell the six Kmart stores in the Czech Republic and the seven in Slovakia to Tesco of Britain for about $117.5 million (equivalent to $241 million in 2025), to focus on its core operations in North America.

=== Mexico ===
In the 1990s, Kmart opened four stores in Mexico, in partnership with the Mexican retailer Liverpool. All were supercenters located in suburbs of Mexico City. About half of the store area was devoted to groceries, and this part of the stores resembled those in the US with some adjustments to the local market. These plus an unfinished store were sold in 1997 to the Mexican hypermarket chain Mega (part of Comercial Mexicana) and remain open under that name, except the store in Tlalnepantla, which was demolished in 2004 to build a Costco.

=== Singapore ===
Plans to open Kmart stores in Singapore were announced in August 1993. Known as K-Mart Metro, it was a joint venture with Metro (Private) Limited, a subsidiary of Metro Holdings of Singapore.

Its first Kmart outlet in the country, a 9,700-square-metre (104,000 sq ft) store in the Marina Square Shopping Center, opened on May 19, 1994. A second Kmart outlet in Lucky Plaza opened in July 1994. A third and final store was opened in Century Square in October 1995. Kmart had a total of three stores in Singapore when the company announced in June 1996 that they plan to close all three stores.

== Management ==
- S. S. Kresge, Founder (1899–1925 president; 1925–1966 CEO)
  - Charles Belden Van Dusen (1925–1938, president)
  - Robert R. Williams (1938–1946, president)
  - D. C. Fisher (1946–1953, president)
  - Franklin P. Williams (1953–1958, president)
- Harry Blair Cunningham (1959–1972, president and general manager; 1966–1972, CEO)
- Robert E. Dewar (1970, president; 1972–1980, CEO)
  - Ervin Wardlow (1972, president)
- Bernard Fauber (1980–1987, chairman, CEO)
- Joseph E. Antonini (1987 – May 1995, CEO)
- Floyd Hall (June 1995 – April 2000, president, chairman; June 1995-March 2002 CEO)
- Charles Conaway (2000–2002, chairman, CEO)
  - Mark Schwartz (-January 2003, president, COO)
- James B. Adamson (2002 – January 2003, president, chairman, CEO; )
- Julian Day (March 2002, president, COO; January 2003 – September 2004, president, COO, CEO)
- Aylwin Lewis (October 2004 – December 2007, president, CEO)
- W. Bruce Johnson (January 2008 – February 2011)
- Herman Darling (March 2011 – December 2012)
- Eddie S. Lampert (January 2013 – October 2018, still on board after filing for bankruptcy)

== See also ==
- Kmart Australia
- Sears Holdings
- Transformco
