= Ronald T. Burr =

American businessman (born 1964)

Ronald Terry Burr
- Born: September 30, 1964 (age 62)
- Occupations: Internet and media entrepreneur
- Known for: Co-founder of NetZero

Ronald Terry Burr (born September 30, 1964) is an American Internet and media entrepreneur, based in Los Angeles, CA. He is the holder of nine internet patents and the co-founder and original chief executive officer of NetZero. During his career he has created over $1 Billion in value for shareholders. Burr was named by InfoWorld as one of the Top 50 IT executives at xSP's, by Interactive Week as one of the 25 Top Unsung Hero's of the Net and was a finalist for Ernst & Young's Entrepreneur of the Year award. Burr was also the chief executive officer of online advertising company WebVisible, Inc. until its closure in 2011 due to unpaid debts.

== Biography ==
=== Early life ===
In 1983, Burr landed a position at Vault Corporation, an early pioneer in the software industry and creators of the Prolok Disk. Burr eventually became Vice President of Software Development.

=== Career ===
In 1989, Burr was recruited as a senior technology consultant for IBM's OS/2. In 1992, Burr co-founded Impact Software, with Stacy Haitsuka, Harold McKenzie and Marwan Zebian, an international IT consulting firm. In 1998 they sold Impact Software to another IT Consulting firm.

In 1997, Burr co-founded NetZero, with Stacy Haitsuka, Harold McKenzie and Marwan Zebian. In 1998, NetZero received initial venture capital from idealab and Bill Gross and later Draper Fisher Jurvetson and Compaq. Burr managed NetZero through its early growth. Burr holds nine Internet technology patents in the areas of online advertising and market research. NetZero went public in Sept of 1999 and formed United Online in a later merger. Interactive Week named him one of the “25 Top Unsung Heroes of the Net”, InfoWorld named him in the “Top 50 IT executives at xSP’s” and he is on Response Magazine's list of the “21 people leading us into the 21st Century.”

In 2001, Burr co-founded Westlake Venture Partners with Stacy Haitsuka, Harold MacKenzie and Marwan Zebian . Westlake Venture Partners invests in emerging companies providing both hands-on management and capital investments. Through Westlake Venture Partners, Burr has served in operational and advisory roles for various companies including of Layer 2 Networks, and Jambo, a leading pay-per call internet company targeting local business. As of 2010, Westlake Venture Partners has funded over 15 companies 5 with successful exits, one pending and two on the horizon.

In 2009, Burr became Chief Operations Officer for WebVisible, a Software as a Service (SaaS) company based in Southern California. In 2010, Burr became the chief executive officer for WebVisible. He held this position until December 27, 2011, when he sent a note to his employees stating the company was to close due to unpaid debts.
