= Chuck Davis (businessman) =

- Born: 1960 (age 65–66)
- Education: Brown University, Harvard University
- Occupation: CEO of Prodege LLC

Chuck Davis (born 1960) is an Internet entrepreneur, and chairman and CEO of Prodege, LLC, an El Segundo, California-based online marketing and consumer research company.

His career includes having been CEO of movie ticket site Fandango, and Shopzilla, also known as Bizrate.com.

== Early life and education ==
Davis was born in 1960 to Joel and Carol Davis. His father was the president of Davis Publications and Sylvia Porter's Personal Finance Magazine Company, and his mother was an interior designer. His grandfather was Bernard G. Davis, co-founder of the Ziff-Davis Publishing Company.

Davis earned a Bachelor of Arts from Brown University (1982) and his Master in Business Administration from Harvard University (1986).

During two of his college years, Davis interned for NFL Commissioner Pete Rozelle having developed a relationship from his middle school first entrepreneurial media venture, Pro Grid Weekly.

== Career ==
Davis started his professional career in marketing, circulation, and financial roles at Time Inc.’s Sports Illustrated, Life, and Time magazines.

Davis was senior vice president of marketing and circulation for TV Guide (Radnor, Pennsylvania) from 1992-95.

In 1996, Davis left TV Guide to join his first digital venture at The Walt Disney Company’s Internet Group in Los Angeles where he became its first President, eCommerce. During his tenure through 1999, Davis launched many merchant and travel businesses including Disneystore.com, Disneyvacations.com, and ESPNstore.com in addition to supervising advertising sales, marketing, and online subscription initiatives.

In 1999 Davis became President and CEO of Shopzilla, Inc., also known as BizRate.com. Shopzilla was acquired by the E.W. Scripps Company for $569 million in 2005.

In 2004, Davis won the 2004 Ernst & Young Entrepreneur of the Year Greater Los Angeles Award.

From 2006–2011, Davis led Fandango as its Chairman and CEO. Comcast Corporation acquired Fandango in April 2007.

In May 2014, Davis became chairman and CEO of Prodege, a company whose properties include Swagbucks, MyPoints, ShopAtHome, and InboxDollars.

Davis is a venture partner for Technology Crossover Ventures (TCV) in Palo Alto, California. In May 2014, concurrently with Davis’ appointment as Prodege's CEO, TCV invested $60 million in Prodege, in the company's only external investment round.

== Other activities ==
Davis is a digital industry board director and adviser to several companies. He is executive chairman of The Teaching Company, a director for the publicly traded wireless company Boingo Wireless, Inc. and Cyndx Partners, a boutique investment bank.

Davis is an entrepreneur-in-residence at Harvard Business School. He is a director for the Brown University Sports Foundation. He wassan alumni elected member of the Brown University's Corporation from 2007 to 2013.

He was voted into the Los Angeles Venture Association (LAVA) Hall of Fame in 2015.

Davis was elected as the 2012–13 international chairman of the Young Presidents' Organization, where he was on its international board for five years. Additionally, he was elected six times to ecommerce industry trade association Shop.org's board of directors, for 11 years.

Davis was a judge for competitions such as Ernst & Young's Entrepreneur of the Year Award, the Idaho Entrepreneurship Challenge, Shop.org, HBS New Venture Competition, the Harvard Challenge, and Brown University's B-Lab Competition.
