= Charles Conaway =

American businessman

- Education: University of Michigan
- Occupation: Businessman
- Known for: Former CEO of Kmart

Charles Conaway is an American businessman who is best known as the former CEO of Kmart. He has also been the president and chief operating officer of CVS Corporation.

== Education ==
Conaway holds an MBA from the University of Michigan.

== Career ==
Before joining Kmart, Conaway was the President and COO of CVS. Conaway became chairman and CEO of Kmart in April 2000.

=== S.E.C. lawsuit ===
In 2005, the U.S. Securities and Exchange Commission filed a lawsuit that accused him of misleading Kmart investors prior to the company's bankruptcy in 2002. The S.E.C. originally sought $22 million from Conaway. A jury found him liable in a trial four years later, in 2009. While he initially appealed the decision, Conaway dropped his appeal in November 2010 and agreed to pay a $5.5 million settlement.
