= SodaHead.com =

Polling technology provider

SodaHead, Inc.
- Company type: Private
- Available in: English
- Founded: March, 2007
- Headquarters: El Segundo, California, United States
- Area served: Worldwide
- Key people: Jason Feffer, Co-Founder; Michelle Fergason, Director of Publisher Operations; Mark Bell, VP of Publisher Development
- Industry: Social Network Service
- Employees: 25
- Parent: Prodege
- Website: www.sodahead.com
- Advertising: Google, AdSense, AppNexus
- Registration: Disabled (User login disabled as of June 3, 2015)
- Current status: Active

SodaHead Inc., was a provider of polling technology for media companies. It previously offered an opinion-based discussion community with staff-written opinion essays and interactive features including slide shows, groups, and message boards.

The company is headquartered in El Segundo, California. It is privately held by Prodege, LLC; investors include Mohr Davidow Ventures, Mission Ventures, the Tech Coast Angels, and Ron Conway.

== History ==
SodaHead was founded by Jason Feffer, former vice president of operations at MySpace, and his childhood friend Michael Glazer. Chris Dominguez, formerly SVP of Business Development at IFILM, became CEO in 2010 and left the company in 2014.

On June 3, 2015, SodaHead sent an email notice to registered account holders, notifying them that “We are announcing today that, effective immediately, SodaHead.com will no longer support user login, poll creation, commenting and messaging. We will, however, continue to support users’ ability to vote on editor-created polls.” Their reasons cited limited human and financial resources directing them to refocus their service as a distributed polling solution for other online publishers, and disabling their social media services. “We ultimately resolved that we cannot do both to ensure our long-term viability, SodaHead needs to focus on furthering its position as a market-leader in distributed polling solutions for online content creators.” The notice redirects members to the SodaHead Facebook page as a solution for continued social media activities. All attempts to log in at the SodaHead website return the error “Login Disabled For your account.”, and any attempt to post comments results in the error text “All new Registrations disabled. Sorry, not accepting any more new users :(”. Since this time web ranking site Alexa shows sodahead.com as a near dead domain, showing a drastic downturn in traffic since June 2015.

== Polling Technology ==
SodaHead Inc., provides polling technology for media companies including ESPN, FoxNews, ABC News, Good Morning America, LA Times and Warner Brothers Television. Its "Pollware", launched in 2013, is a custom ad-supported polling technology that runs on third-party sites. Publishers generate advertising revenue by displaying the polls on their sites. SodaHead's Pollware partners include Maxim, LakersNation, DodgersNation, Ranker, The Christian Post, and HNGN.

On June 3, 2015 SodaHead announced that they are shifting focus to "other content creators and publishers who wanted to use the same polling technology that powers SodaHead.com for their sites." In an email notice sent to registered account holders, SodaHead users were notified that "SodaHead needs to focus on furthering its position as a market-leader in distributed polling solutions for online content creators", and "we had to evaluate how effectively we could serve SodaHead.com as a community polling site while simultaneously addressing the needs of online publishers, where our polling solution is met with an incredibly strong market-fit.".

== Website ==
On SodaHead.com, people could ask questions, post breaking news of the day, and share opinions on issues. Members could pose a question to the community, answer other people's questions, vote on, comment on, and debate on various topics. Topics included music, movies, celebrity gossip, politics, religion, technology, and business. In its topics and world views the site was largely focused on the United States.

== See also ==
- Myspace
- Swagbucks
- Social networking service
