= Harry B. Cunningham =

American businessman and retailer

Harry Cunningham
- Born: 1907; Pennsylvania, United States
- Died: 11 November 1992 (aged 84–85); North Palm Beach, Florida, United States
- Occupations: Company founder; Retailer; Company President
- Known for: Kmart Group

Harry B. Cunningham (1907 – November 11, 1992) was an American businessman and retailer who founded Kmart in 1962, along with S. S. Kresge. Cunningham had a vision to convert the retail chain into a discounter. At the time, Cunningham was sharply criticized by some, including Kresge shareholders, as possibly destroying the company. The success of Kmart proved his vision.

He was president of the company from 1959 to 1972, having joined the retailer as an assistant store manager in 1930. Cunningham was credited by Sam Walton as being the first to design a discount store. Walton added that Cunningham should be remembered as one of the leading retailers of all time. Cunningham and Walton both visited, and were impressed by the early and innovative discounter Ann & Hope in Cumberland, Rhode Island.
