= PrivatePhone =

Voicemail service developed by NetZero

PrivatePhone logo

PrivatePhone was a free voicemail service developed by NetZero on June 1, 2006 as a way for users to get their own voicemail for free. Originally the service only allowed 10 voicemail messages in the main inbox at a time, and it gave the notice "Please leave a message for this Privatephone.com subscriber after the tone"; however, this was later changed to just "Please leave a message after the tone". On February 19, 2008, PrivatePhone ended its service.

== Features ==
- During spring through summer 2007, the 10 minutes per call, 10 calls per month limit on the call-back feature was not working and allowed subscribers to make unlimited calls for an unlimited amount of time. However this limit was fixed after the summer of 2007.
- Users could block callers that block their caller ID using the call log; call would appear as "Blocked Caller ID" followed by the date they were blocked.
- Around November 2007, whenever a PrivatePhone user used the caller return or Gotta Go Call feature, the full name that was entered when registering the account showed up on the Caller ID Name of certain telephone providers (mostly VOIP Phone providers such as Time Warner's Digital Phone Service). Previously it either showed "Out of Area", "Name Unavailable" or "*State* Call" (replacing *State* with the state the phone number originated from) as the Caller ID Name. This new addition proved that the data was directly from PrivatePhone, because using a service such as Jajah to connect a PrivatePhone number to a landline phone number would display the Caller ID "Out of Area", "Name Unavailable" or "*State* Call" as before.

=== Gotta Go Call ===
The "Gotta Go Call" feature was one of Netzero's unique features that was used to schedule a call to your phone with an automated message that could be used to give one an excuse to leave an uncomfortable social situation. When users scheduled a "Gotta Go Call", they received a call from the number 1-800-991-9984.

=== Changes to features since launch ===
- Changed the voicemail message limit from 10 to 10,000 messages (500 per day)
- Added call-back feature (Only 10 minutes per call and 10 calls per month)
- Added "Gotta Go Call"
- Changed notice after greeting from "Please leave a message for this Privatephone.com subscriber after the tone." to "Please leave a message after the tone".

== Limitations ==
Like any other free service, there were limits on what one could do with PrivatePhone, including:

- Messages could only be 2 minutes or shorter
- The call-back feature was only 10 minutes per call and 10 calls per month
- Users could not pick a Caller ID Name
- Users could not use call forwarding
- Users could not change their phone number
- The greeting could only be 45 seconds or less
- Users had to keep their account active by either calling their number periodically or logging into their web mail on the NetZero web site.
- Users could pick any state in the US for a phone number except Alaska and Hawaii.
- The "Gotta Go Call" feature stopped working when the call-back feature went out. The feature would call but would not have the "Hey! What's up? I was just wondering, do you want to come over?" message; instead it would say nothing.

== Advertising and promotion ==
In late 2006, PrivatePhone began making promotional videos showing scenarios of people who needed PrivatePhone and posted them on their web site to show people why they should sign up. In early 2007, Netzero began advertising Netzero Voice and PrivatePhone at Best Buy by making special PrivatePhone CDs which included the videos featured on the web site and a phone number (1-866-755-7055) where people could sign up by telephone if they called with a mobile phone (so that people could receive their account information by text message).

=== PrivatePhone promotional videos ===
These are three promotional videos that were made for PrivatePhone which include different scenarios in which the necessity of PrivatePhone is shown, then a professor comes on and gives a short explanation on how the service is free (no contracts to sign, no credit card required and nothing extra to buy) and all incoming calls go right to voicemail that you can check online or on the phone and how PrivatePhone could have helped the person in the scenario. Each video was produced and animated by 23D Films and were directed by Ben Ceccarelli.

==== Jenny ====
This video shows a scenario with a woman who posted her resume online and her resume has her cell phone number and while working for her job she answered calls from three prospective employers right in front of the one she's working for. The professor explains that PrivatePhone can help you stay on top of job prospects without jeopardizing the one you have.

==== Jane and Dick ====
Dick and Jane meet each other in a bar and Jane thinks Dick is attractive and they have a great conversation together. Jane gives Dick her cell phone number and hope to hear from Dick again, and she does again, and again, and again, and again. The professor explains that you can use PrivatePhone to connect with people without use your home or cell phone numbers.

==== Bob ====
Bob likes to shop online and gave out his home number while shopping. It was promptly handed to telemarketers. Bob got himself a one-time deal, but Bob continues to pay a mealtime cost. The professor explains that you can use PrivatePhone to give your number out when you shop and all future calls from retailers go straight to voicemail that one can check quickly over the phone.

== Discontinuation ==
PrivatePhone originally announced that on December 31, 2007, they would be ending their service, but in January they extended the closure date to February 19, 2008. Though users were not able to keep the service, PrivatePhone had allowed existing users to move their PrivatePhone numbers to Packet8 for a fee. At that time, new signups were no longer accepted, and PrivatePhone sent a message to all of its users on January 16, 2008 informing them about its discontinuation. Despite the service ending on February 19, 2008, NetZero still gave existing users the opportunity to keep their number.

"PrivatePhone Closing Message"
PrivatePhone's Closing Message that was sent to all users (0:46; Ogg Vorbis, 687 KB)

== See also ==
- GotVoice
- GrandCentral
- Netzero
