= Ann & Hope =

Defunct American retailer

Ann & Hope Inc.
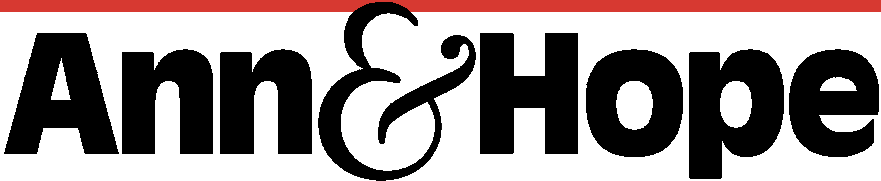
- Type: Privately held company
- Industry: Retail
- Founded: 1953
- Founder: Marty Chase
- Defunct: 2001 (department stores); 2020 (outlet stores)
- Fate: Closure
- Headquarters: 1 Ann & Hope Way; Cumberland, Rhode Island 02864-6918; United States
- Number of locations: Rhode Island, Massachusetts and Connecticut
- Key people: Irwin Chase (President); Ron Dore (CEO); Paul Carr (GM)
- Owner: Irwin Chase
- Website: curtainandbathoutlet.com

Ann & Hope was a Rhode Island–based retailer that helped to pioneer several practices now common in modern big-box stores. The company was named after the ship Ann and Hope, which was built in 1798 by the firm Brown & Ives, famous merchants of early Providence, Rhode Island. The name was given to the ship in honor of Ann, wife of Nicholas Brown Jr., and Hope, wife of Thomas Poynton Ives. They operated from 1953 to 2001 in the Northeastern United States, and they formerly operated a small chain of home fashion outlets, garden outlets, and dollar outlets in Rhode Island, Massachusetts, and Connecticut.

== History ==
=== Early years ===
Ann & Hope was founded by Martin Chase, who was born in 1906 in Kiev, Russian Empire (modern-day Ukraine), and moved with his family to Providence, Rhode Island, at age six. He was the only one of six sons who did not work in his father’s automobile repair business. Instead, when he was 20, he got a job working at a store called Fintex. After Fintex closed its doors in 1929, Chase worked at Howard's Clothes until 1933. Then he started Chase Clothing, where he undersold other area clothing stores by reducing overhead: for example he did not offer alterations and used inexpensive store fixtures.

As World War II approached, the clothing market fell into decline, and Chase began to look for another line of work. In 1946, he purchased the Ann & Hope Mill complex in the village of Lonsdale in Cumberland, Rhode Island. He split the large, empty mill into several small pieces and rented them individually.

Some time before December 1953, one of the tenants left the Mill, leaving a large amount of ribbon behind. Rather than dispose of it, the Chases opened the area to the other employees of the Mill and sold the ribbon. Chase then had the idea to reopen a clothing store in the Mill, initially on the third floor. By the following spring, the operation had become large enough that it was relocated to the ground floor. Over time more products were added, and by 1969, Ann & Hope was a $40 million (~$269 million in 2025) per year operation.

=== Legacy ===
Ann & Hope was one of the first self-service department stores, in which customers could look at items without sales personnel, and was also part of the first wave of retail stores in the 1950s to use big basket shopping carts. The original mill location also featured a large parking area, which was not common at the time, as well as a basement level with even more merchandise. A special shopping cart conveyor was operated by staff to move store patrons' items from one floor to the other. Other now-familiar features such as having a central checkout area and a liberal store return policy were also pioneered by Ann & Hope.

Ann & Hope also had several features now common to big-box retail facilities. For example, some Ann & Hope stores had full-scale cafeterias. When originally constructed, Ann & Hope stores also had an area that was rented to a sub-tenant, with both in-store and outside entrances, a variation of which is a relatively recent introduction in larger Walmart stores. Many Ann & Hope locations had limited success renting to tenants, and before the chain's closing in 2001, many had been converted to store-run garden shops.

Sam Walton, founder of Walmart, visited the Ann & Hope chain in 1961 and got the idea for his store from it, and Harry Cunningham visited Ann & Hope in the process of preparing to launch the first Kmart store.

=== 1989–2007 ===
Following a slow 1989–90 holiday season, the Seekonk, Massachusetts store experienced lay-offs, most notably in the home-wares and rug and blind departments. These layoffs were seen by some as a sign of the challenges that the Seekonk and other Ann & Hope stores would face in an increasingly competitive regional market during the 1990s. All of the Ann & Hope department stores closed in the spring of 2001, except for the two Rhode Island stores: the original location in Cumberland and the store in Warwick. High-value properties that Ann & Hope owned in Massachusetts were sold off. The two locations that remained open were downsized significantly and turned into off-price "outlet stores". In the years following the closing, new Ann & Hope–branded outlet stores, such as the Ann & Hope Curtain & Bath Outlet, were opened. Several of these new Ann & Hope outlet stores occupied space near where Ann & Hope department stores had previously existed.

=== 2007–present ===
As of 2007, the original Cumberland property is home to an Ann & Hope Curtain and Bath Outlet and an outdoor Garden Outlet. In August 2007, the owners of Ann & Hope made public their intention to convert the Cumberland mill store to a "mixed use" development of retail and residential space.

The Cumberland mill building is now home to the Bargain City Galleria which includes a flea market, food court and auction center.

As of 2010 Ann & Hope Curtain & Bath is still going strong, opening stores in Vernon and Newington, Connecticut.

In April and May 2011, Ann & Hope opened two new stores in Raynham and Weymouth, Massachusetts, buying out two Curtain Factory Outlet retailers. This makes a current total of 11 Ann & Hope Outlet Stores: 2 in Rhode Island, 2 in Connecticut, and 7 in Massachusetts.

In May 2013, Ann & Hope continued to grow with its newest Curtain & Bath Outlet location opening in Westborough, Massachusetts.

After a brief closure early in Spring 2020 due to the COVID-19 pandemic, several Ann & Hope/Curtain & Bath Outlet Garden Outlets reopened on April 27, 2020.

The reopening of outdoor shopping areas – including garden products and patio – was made possible in part by New England governors partially reopening some businesses to the public during the COVID-19 pandemic. This included Rhode Island Governor Gina Raimondo's response to constituents who expressed a desire that small garden shops be reopened. Governor Raimondo stated at a press conference on April 18, 2020, "I've heard you. I'm hearing you and I want you to know that I directed [the Department of Business Regulation] to work with [the Department of Environmental Management] to address this issue and figure out a safe way for you all to open your businesses." Interior shopping areas remained temporarily closed as of late April 2020. This step was taken in keeping with statewide policies on social distancing, and the designation of critical and non-critical retailers during the pandemic.

On June 17, 2020, company officials stated that, despite the closure of three stores in Weymouth, Raynham, and Westborough, Massachusetts, the chain would not be closing all stores. Despite this, it was announced on June 29, 2020, that the company would be closing all remaining outlet stores, with a possibility of keeping select garden center locations open. In 2022, Ann & Hope's Warwick, Rhode Island property was sold to Crossroads Capital Fund VI LLC, and its Cumberland, Rhode Island mill complex was sold to Hartford Holdings LLC, a Providence-based real estate company.
