= NetZero =

American Internet service provider

- NetZero logo from its founding on October 19, 1998, which has been used again since March 19, 2012
- Type: Subsidiary
- Industry: Internet service provider
- Founded: October 19, 1998; 27 years ago
- Founders: Ronald T. Burr; Stacy A Haitsuka; Harold R MacKenzie; Marwan A Zebian
- Headquarters: Los Angeles, California, U.S.
- Area served: United States, Europe, India, Canada (Partial)
- Key people: Ananth Veluppillai, President
- Revenue: US$225,000,000 (2013)
- Parent: United Online
- Website: www.netzero.net

NetZero is an Internet service provider based in Woodland Hills, Los Angeles, California. It is a subsidiary of United Online, which in turn is a subsidiary of investment bank B. Riley Financial. United Online is also the parent of Juno Online Services and BlueLight Internet Services.

== History ==
NetZero corporate logo used from October 19, 1998 to March 18, 2012

Netzero bought FreeInet around 1998. FreeInet was the first free national internet service provider. NetZero was launched in October 1998, founded by Ronald T. Burr (original CEO), Stacy Haitsuka, Marwan Zebian and Harold MacKenzie. NetZero grew to 1,000,000 users in six months. NetZero's model was free Internet access to attract an audience for highly targeted advertising. NetZero was the first company to invent real-time URL targeted advertising based on surfing patterns under US patent 6,366,298 Monitoring of Individual Internet Usage. The founders raised $60 million in venture capital in four separate equity financings. Venture investors included idealab, Draper Fisher Jurvetson, Foundation Capital, Clearstone Venture Partners and Compaq. NetZero signed a distribution deal with Compaq and was the only ISP to be included in the out-of-box experience (OOBE). In September 1999, NetZero went public on the NASDAQ exchange with the symbol NZRO. Mark Goldston was hired as CEO, Charles Hilliard was hired as CFO and Ronald Burr took the position of President and Chief Technology Officer.

NetZero's most prominent advertising placement was as part of NetZero @ the Half for the NBA on NBC's halftime show in the early 2000s, replacing Prudential.

In late 1999 several other companies began to copy the NetZero free access model including Juno Online Services, (which since August 1996 had offered E-mail but not World Wide Web access for free), Spinway launched with Yahoo! and AltaVista, Freei and BlueLight Internet, which was originally owned by Kmart. They claimed to offer free Internet service forever, in exchange for displaying ads, either on a permanent toolbar or on a "banner" that was shown when online. NetZero sued them for infringing on a banner ad patent. After the dot-com bust in early 2000, NetZero acquired its competitors as each went bankrupt. In addition NetZero acquired AimTV which displayed full video quality 30 second ad spots as well as Simpli and RocketCash.

Starting in January 2001, NetZero began charging for access time over 40 hours per month. Users who exceeded 40 hours were directed to the company's "Platinum" service, which provided unlimited access for $9.95 per month. With the income statement reinvigorated through charging heavier users of the system, NetZero merged with its rival Juno Online Services and created a new holding company, United Online which traded on NASDAQ under the symbol UNTD until Netzero was acquired by B. Riley Financial in July 2016. NetZero later lowered the threshold for their free service to 10 hours per month.

In June 2005, the company released a new client that replaced the advertising bar with an Internet Explorer Browser Helper Object. In July 2005, NetZero introduced a service called "3G," standing for the "third generation of Internet." The company vaguely claimed it was so fast, "you wouldn't believe it wasn't broadband." As dial-up connections are subject to the limits of 56k modems, the service does not increase transmission speed. Instead, the service prefetches HTML markup, JavaScript and other small files and compresses them. Video, images, and other non-text files are not compressed. This technology also utilizes the user's cache to prevent redownloading. A newer service, "NetZero DSL" was released soon after. In 2012, the company said they still had about 750,000 dial-up subscribers.

NetZero has versions of its proprietary dial-up software for computers running Mac OS 9 or Mac OS X. NetZero previously offered a Linux version of the NetZero software advertised as being for Linspire, however the software could be installed on any Debian-based i386 or x86-64 Linux distribution, NetZero can also be installed on any RPM-based Linux distribution as long as Alien is used to convert the NetZero Debian package into an RPM package. In addition, the Linux version requires the Java Runtime Environment to be installed prior to use of the NetZero dialer. However the current Linux version of the dialer no longer functions properly with the service since 2009.

== Wireless service ==
While continuing to provide nationwide dial-up access service (and DSL broadband service) in March 2012, NetZero launched a mobile broadband service for users who purchase their hardware, using the Clearwire network. It has since expanded the service across the nationwide Sprint 3G network, and also launched a home wireless broadband service which is intended to provide wireless access in the home or office. In 2013, it debuted NetZero DataShield, a personal virtual private network which encrypts and protects users’ data when they connect to the Internet via any WiFi connection, including public WiFi access points. The company offers NetZero Hotspot.

== See also ==
- Comparison of webmail providers
- Webmail
- PrivatePhone
