= Juno Online Services =

American internet service provider

United Online Software Development (India) Private Limited
- Website type: Subsidiary
- Founded: May 1996 in Manhattan, New York
- Headquarters: Newark, New Jersey, United States
- Industry: Internet service provider
- Parent: United Online
- Website: https://www.juno.com/

Juno Online Services, also called simply Juno, is an Internet service provider based in the United States. It originated as a free email service and later expanded its offerings. Juno is a subsidiary of United Online, which in turn is a subsidiary of investment bank B. Riley Financial. United Online is also the parent of NetZero and BlueLight Internet Services.

== History ==
The earliest Juno logo, circa 1996, the year the company was founded.

Juno was founded in May 1996 by Charles Ardai, Brian Marsh and Clifford Tse, with equity capital provided by the D. E. Shaw Group and headquarters in the same Midtown Manhattan building as Shaw. In August 1996, it began a free e-mail service — a customer would install the proprietary Juno client which would allow them to send and receive email of about 35 kilobytes in size. Version 1 did not offer attachments or other features. The user could write emails with the Juno client and would periodically sign in by dial-up. Upon doing so, the Juno client would upload any emails the user had written, download any new incoming emails in the online mailbox, and download targeted advertisements, which were displayed in the client. This was similar to "QWK" and similar less automated offline readers that had been used for years by BBSes to save phone line connect time.

In June 1998, Juno expanded its service to offer premium support for paying subscribers, and added the ability to browse the web in addition to use of email. In December 1999, Juno began to offer the same service (without technical support) for free, provided the user ran the Juno client, which displayed a bar containing advertisements for the majority of the time that the user was online. Juno later imposed limits on how much usage could be made of its free Internet service in a single month. Free service was limited, as of the middle of July 2015, to a maximum of 10 hours per month.

With the collapse of the 1990s Dot-com bubble, Internet advertising revenues declined and the company shifted emphasis to offering discount Web and mail services similar to large ISPs, but at half the price.

Juno stock began trading on NASDAQ in May 1999, under the symbol JWEB. In June 2001, Juno and NetZero, which also traded on NASDAQ but under the symbol NZRO, announced a merger. The two had been in litigation over the patent which NetZero held to provide free Internet access by using an Ad bar. Though NetZero held the said patent, Juno had six million members, and thus was far larger. Eventually, they chose to merge rather than continue to fight in court. By September 2001, the two companies were merged into the present-day United Online, and both JWEB and NZRO were delisted.

Juno released, along with NetZero, a service that purported to make web browsing faster. It displayed pictures at lower resolutions, thereby speeding page loads.

In 2001, Juno enacted a new version of their privacy policy. By continuing to use the service, customers implicitly agreed to allow Juno to harvest any unused CPU cycles. The plan was to assemble a quasi supercomputer using customers processors and sell computing services to private companies. This additional revenue was intended to keep the company afloat after the dot-com bubble. Most customers did not notice the change of terms. Though a customer for the Juno Virtual Supercomputer service was announced, it remained unclear, as of the middle of July 2015, whether the company followed through on this plan.

== Proprietary client ==
The Juno client software icon.

The client software was updated many times in the late 1990s. Version 1.49 was final for Windows 3.1, except for a date problem that was fixed in version 1.51. Versions 4.0.11 and 5.0.33 were final for Windows 95 and later. Version 4 had attachments and a spell checker, and displayed fonts and colors. For old messages, it had storage folders, each stored in a separate file containing up to 1000 messages.

Version 5 added an ineffective integral twit/spam filter and the ability to write messages in chosen fonts and colors with inline images. It stored its old messages in a different format, with one large file for all messages. When disk free space was not several times larger than the message file, it often suffered "folder collapse" in which all messages returned to the "Inbox" or disappeared.

As of December 1, 2004, use of an e-mail client such as the Juno client, Microsoft Outlook Express, or Eudora had ceased to be free. Users who wished to use an e-mail client instead of Juno's web-based e-mail interface were required to pay for either Juno Platinum or Juno Megamail.

The Juno client software's version 5.0, build 33, would not work with Internet Explorer 7. However, by the time Microsoft released the final version of IE7, Juno had released Juno 5.0 build 49, which resolved the issues with IE7 and made it compatible with Windows Vista.

Version 8, compatible with Windows 7, was released in 2009. The proprietary mailers were only slightly supported in the 21st century, and the service supported POP3 standard mail clients.

No version of Juno's offline mail reader was made to use third party utilities to scan for viruses or clean out E-mail spam among messages that had already been downloaded. Versions 5 and 8 could weed downloaded email messages individually by exact email address matches; however, there were no wildcards, boolean exclusion-filters, or routing features to facilitate this. The company opened a spamdesk to help screen spam at the servers, thus minimizing the amount of spam received by the Juno client.

While the Juno client software could back up e-mails and addresses, it did not support exporting these to other clients, nor did other clients support importing from Juno. Only a handful of third-party utilities were made that could do anything with the proprietary message storage format; instead, users were forced to use third party applications to convert and export the data, principally juno5bdb for messages (which Juno stored in a Berkeley DB), and Dawn for addresses.

== Development centers ==
Juno also opened an offshore development center at Hyderabad, India, which it called United Online Software Development India Pvt. Ltd.

== See also ==
- United Online
- NetZero
