= United Online =

Internet service provider

- United Online logo
- Company type: Subsidiary
- Traded as: Nasdaq: UNTD
- Founded: 2001
- Defunct: July 1, 2016 (as an independent company)
- Headquarters: Westlake Village, California
- Key people: ANANTH VELUPPILLAI, CEO
- Brands: NetZero, Juno Online Services, MyPoints, StayFriends
- Owner: BRPI Acquisition Co.

United Online, Inc. was an independent public company formed by the 2001 merger of NetZero and Juno Online Services. It is currently a subsidiary of investment bank B. Riley Financial. The company's range of products and services has evolved significantly since its inception as a provider of dial-up Internet access. This has been aided by a series of acquisitions that have included Classmates Online (2004), MyPoints (2006), and FTD Group, Inc. (2008), the latter of which was spun off as its own company in 2013. United Online is headquartered in Woodland Hills, California, United States.

The company claims to have more than 100 million registered accounts. The company’s Content & Media segment provides networking services and products (Classmates and StayFriends). Its primary communications segment services are internet access, and services and devices (NetZero and Juno). United Online operates through a global network of locations in the U.S., Germany, and India. On July 1, 2016, B. Riley Financial completed its acquisition of United Online for $11.00 per share in a transaction valued at approximately $170 million.

== History ==
United Online, Inc. was formed in June 2001 by the merger of Internet service providers NetZero and Juno Online Services. The two merged companies were to be independent subsidiaries of United Online, and the resultant company was the United States' second largest internet service provider at the time.

In November 2013, United Online spun off its floral delivery subsidiary, FTD, which became a separate NASDAQ-traded company called FTD Companies, Inc., under the symbol FTD.

Directly following the spin-off of FTD, long time CEO Mark Goldston, who had been with the company for 14 years, taken it public and presided over the acquisitions and growth, left the company. Francis Lobo, who had spent 10 years with AOL, eventually rising to the position of president of AOL Services, was selected to take Goldston's place as CEO. The company continued to struggle, and Lobo eventually resigned. Following Lobo's exit, the investment bank B. Riley Financial acquired the remnants of UOL on July 1, 2016, naming Robert J. Taragan the new CEO of the subsidiary.

In April 2016, United Online sold MyPoints to El Segundo, California-based loyalty program marketer Prodege.

== Products ==
Faced with the introduction and rapid expansion of broadband Internet-access services, United Online has diversified its products and service offerings, both via acquisitions and by evolving its current brands.

=== ISP ===
In September 2007, NetZero launched its first broadband access service, NetZero DSL. In May 2008, it launched Juno DSL. Together, NetZero DSL and Juno DSL provided almost 30 percent of United Online’s ISP customers, and provided those customers with the ability to upgrade to broadband while maintaining their NetZero or Juno email addresses.

=== Mobile broadband ===
In March 2012, NetZero expanded into the wireless Internet access market with the debut of NetZero Mobile Broadband, a value-priced mobile broadband service using the Clearwire network. NetZero Mobile Broadband was available in over 80 cities, and allowed subscribers to choose from four monthly data plans. It also offered a one-year free trial with the purchase of a NetZero Connection device.

NetZero Mobile Broadband has since rolled out the service across the nationwide using the Sprint 3G network, expanding its coverage to more than 276 million people. NetZero also offers a Home Wireless Broadband service which is intended to provide limited wireless access in the home or office. In 2013, it debuted NetZero DataShield, a personal VPN which encrypts and protects users’ data when they connect to the Internet via any WiFi connection, including public WiFi hubs.

NetZero HotSpot is a service that the company offers.

=== Mobile phone ===
At the end of 2014, UOL rolled out a mobile phone service to their NetZero brand. The service provides 3G coverage, and features refurbished equipment (such as an iPhone 4 or Samsung Galaxy SIII for the price of $199 each) and limited monthly data.

=== Classmates.com ===
United Online's Classmates subsidiary began digitizing high school yearbooks in 2010, giving members the ability to view more than 30,000 high school yearbooks at Classmates.com. The Classmates Yearbook Initiative has since grown to over 250,000 yearbooks.
