= James Anderson =

James Anderson may refer to:

== Arts ==
- James Anderson (American actor) (1921–1969), American actor
- James Anderson (British author) (1936–2007), British mystery writer
- James Anderson (English actor) (born 1980), British actor
- James Anderson (filmmaker) (1902–1960), American film director
- James Anderson (songwriter, born 1825) (1825–1899), Tyneside songwriter
- James Anderson (poet and songwriter) (1835–1922), Scottish poet and songwriter, author of Sawney's Letters
- James Anderson (American writer), American television writer
- James Arthur Anderson (born 1955), American writer
- James McConnell Anderson (1907–1998), American painter and potter
- Big Dad Ritch (James Richard Earl Anderson), lead vocalist for American heavy metal band Texas Hippie Coalition
- James Robertson Anderson (1811–1895), Scottish actor
- Bill Anderson (James William Anderson III, born 1937), American singer
- J-Flexx (James Anderson, born 1968), American rapper and producer

== Government ==
- James Anderson (British politician) (1800–1864), lord provost of Glasgow and British MP for Stirling
- James Anderson (Manitoba politician) (1903–1983), Canadian politician
- James Drummond Anderson (1886–1968), financial commissioner of the Punjab
- James Drummond Anderson (1852–1920), member of the Indian Civil Service
- James H. Anderson (politician) (1878–1936), lieutenant governor of Delaware in the 1920s
- James Hodson Anderson (1909–1996), Nebraska attorney general
- James Lee Anderson (born 1948), American politician in the Wyoming Senate
- James Sibree Anderson (1841–1927), Scottish-born Wisconsin politician
- James Thomas Milton Anderson (1878–1946), Canadian politician; premier of Saskatchewan, 1929–1934
- James Alexander Anderson (died 1930), Canadian politician

== Military ==
- James Anderson (defense official), acting under secretary of defense for policy
- James Anderson Jr. (1947–1967), USMC, Vietnam War Medal of Honor recipient
- James Anderson (Royal Navy officer) (1765–1835)
- James Anderson (Medal of Honor) (1849–1918), American Indian Wars soldier
- James Patton Anderson (1822–1872), Confederate Army general

== Science ==
- James A. Anderson (cognitive scientist) (born 1940), American professor of cognitive science and brain science at Brown University
- James Anderson (biomedical engineer), American professor of pathology, macromolecular science and biomedical engineering at Case Western Reserve University
- James Anderson (botanical collector) (1797–1842), Scottish botanical collector who later became the Superintendent of the Sydney Botanic Gardens
- James Anderson (botanist) (1739–1809), Scottish botanist
- James Anderson (civil engineer) (1793–1861), Scottish civil engineer
- James Anderson (mechanical engineer) (1871–1945), Scottish mechanical engineer
- James B. Anderson (1935–2021), American professor of chemistry and physics at Penn State University
- James D. Anderson (1930–1976), American herpetologist
- James G. Anderson (born 1944), American professor of atmospheric chemistry at Harvard University
- James H. Anderson (computer scientist), American computer scientist
- James M. Anderson (scientist), American scientist
- Sir James Anderson, 1st Baronet (1792–1861), Irish inventor

== Sports ==
- James Allan Anderson (chess player) (1906–1991), American chess player
- James Anderson (American football) (born 1983), American football linebacker
- James Anderson (badminton) (born 1974), English badminton player
- James Anderson (basketball) (born 1989), American basketball player
- Duncan Anderson (James Duncan Anderson, 1931–1996), Australian amateur Australian rules footballer and cricketer for Oxford University
- James Anderson (cricketer) (born 1982), English international cricketer
- James Anderson (Australian cricketer) (1889–1951), Australian cricketer for the Queensland representative team
- James Anderson (footballer), Scottish footballer
- Jamie Anderson (golfer) (James Anderson, 1842–1905), Scottish golfer
- Jim Anderson (swimmer) (James Allan Anderson, born 1963), British Paralympic swimmer
- James Anderson (tennis) (1894–1973), Australian tennis player
- James Oswald Anderson (1872–1932), Argentine sportsman

== Other ==
- James A. Anderson (academic administrator), chancellor of Fayetteville State University
- James Anderson (explorer), Hudson's Bay Company executive after whom the Anderson River (Northwest Territories) was named
- James Anderson (Freemason) (1679/80–1739), Church of Scotland minister, author and Freemason
- James Anderson (lawyer) (1662–1728), Scottish lawyer
- James Anderson (missionary) (fl. 1865–1870), Protestant Christian missionary
- James Anderson of Hermiston (1739–1808), Scottish Enlightenment agriculturalist, lawyer, inventor, economist, writer, publisher
- James Anderson (farm manager), whisky distiller at Mount Vernon
- James Anderson (sea captain) (1824–1893), captain of SS Great Eastern laying transatlantic telegraph cable
- James Anderson (trade unionist) (died 1917), British trade union leader
- James Craig Anderson (1963–2011), American murder victim
- James M. Anderson (hospital executive), American hospital executive
- Sir James Norman Dalrymple Anderson (1908–1994), English missionary and academic Arabist
- James R. Anderson (1864–1913), lawyer in South Australia

== See also ==
- Jim Anderson (disambiguation)
- Jamie Anderson (disambiguation)
- Jimmy Anderson (disambiguation)
- James Andersen (disambiguation)
