= James M. Anderson =

James M. Anderson may refer to:

- James M. Anderson (scientist), American scientist
- James M. Anderson (hospital executive), American hospital executive
- James McConnell Anderson (1907–1998), American painter and potter
- James Thomas Milton Anderson (1878–1946), Canadian politician; Premier of Saskatchewan, 1929–1934
