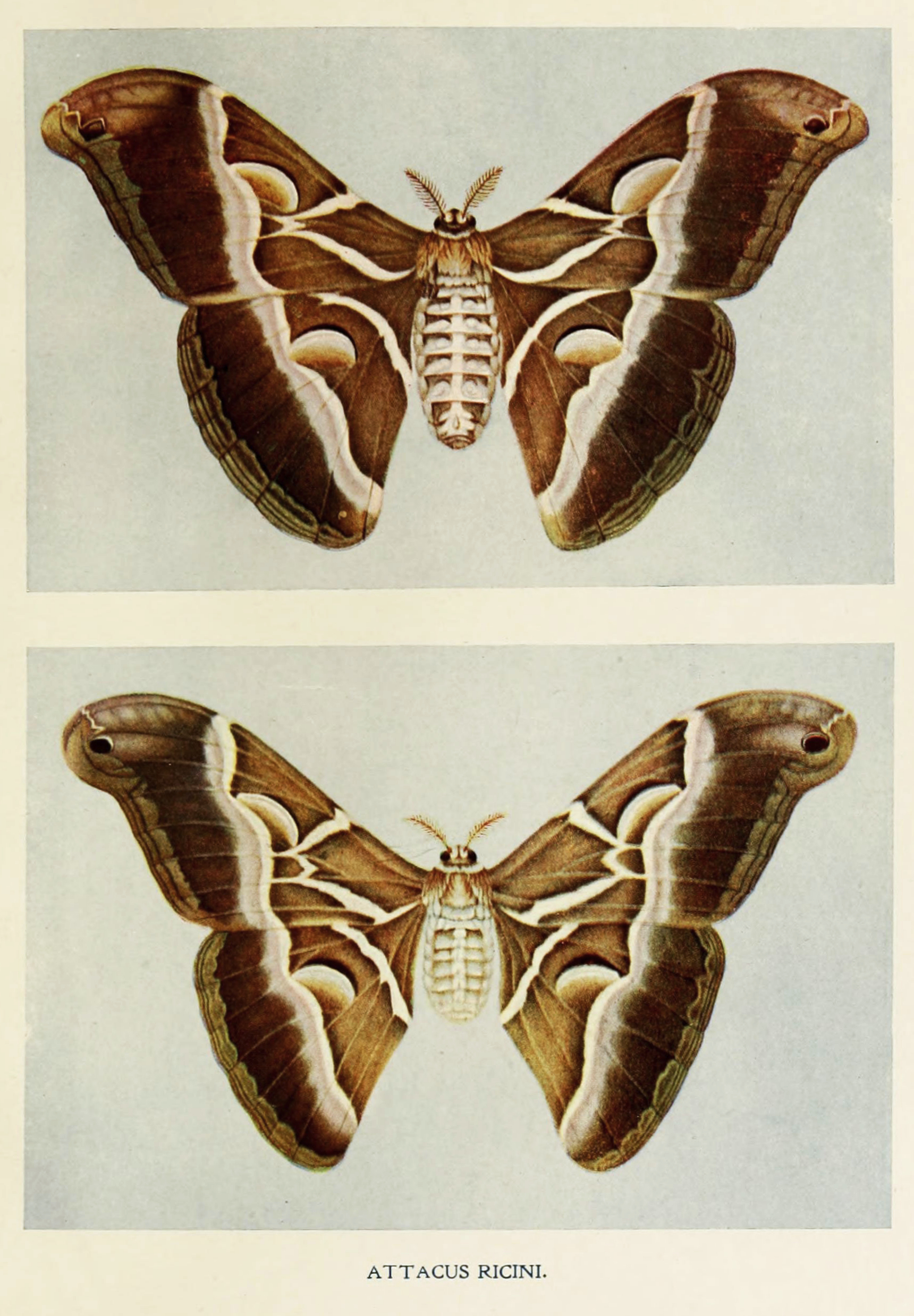
- Both sexes of Samia ricini depicted in Indian insect life by Maxwell-Lefroy.

Conservation status
- Domesticated

Scientific classification
- Kingdom: Animalia
- Phylum: Arthropoda
- Clade: Pancrustacea
- Class: Insecta
- Order: Lepidoptera
- Family: Saturniidae
- Genus: Samia
- Species: S. ricini

Binomial name
- Samia ricini (Jones in Anderson, 1791)

Synonyms
- Attacus ricini Donovan, 1798; Philosamia ricini

= Samia ricini =

Genus of moths

Samia ricini, the eri silkmoth, is a species of insect, a domesticated member of the family Saturniidae which includes the giant silk moths. This moth is a domestic polyhybrid that has been bred for centuries due to the silk it makes. The name is based on the host plant used for feeding the caterpillars, castor, Ricinus communis. This moth is derived from several different species within the genus including Samia cynthia and Samia canningi. It is one of the 2 domestic species of lepidopterans, along with the domestic silk moth.

== Gallery ==
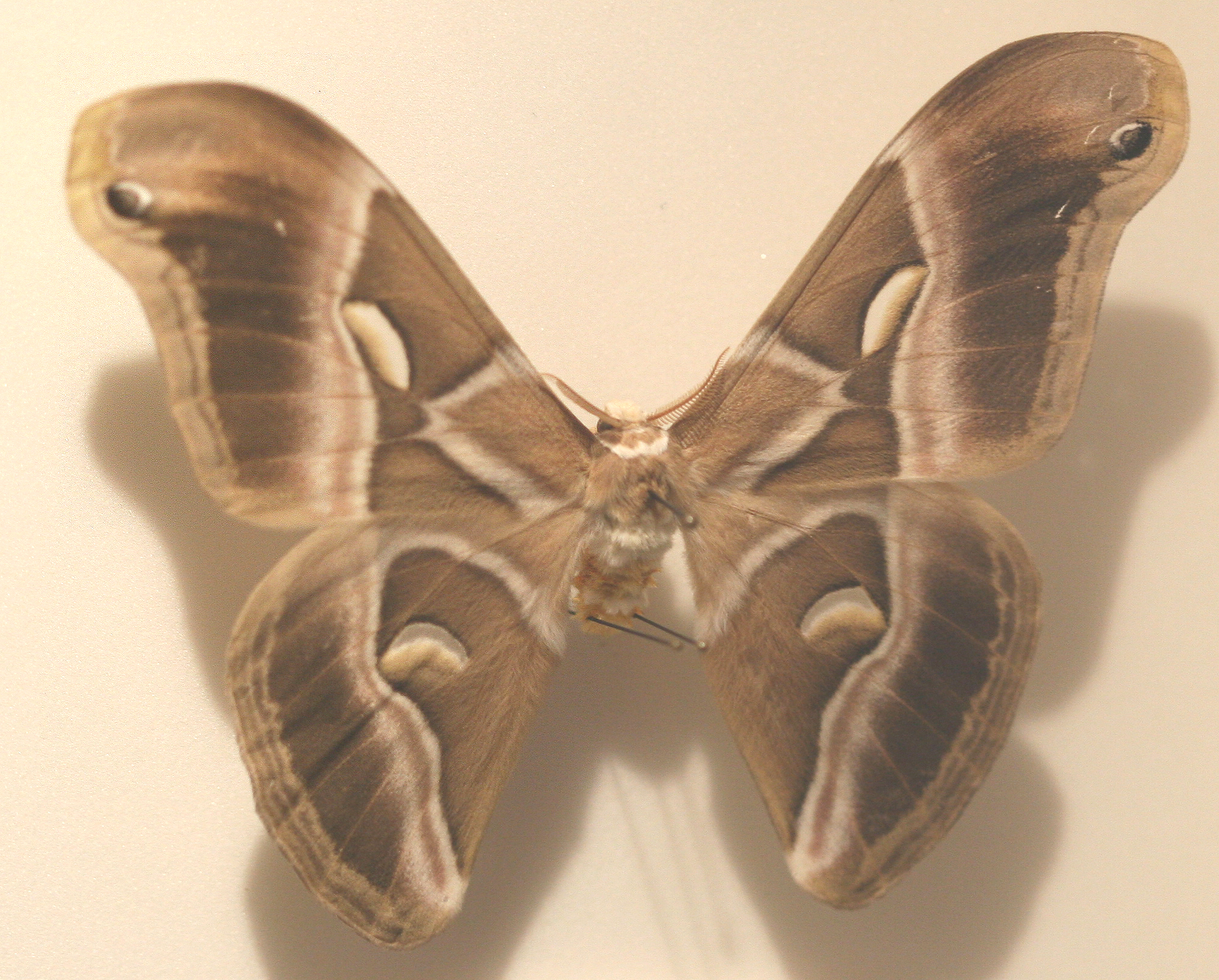
Eri silkmoth

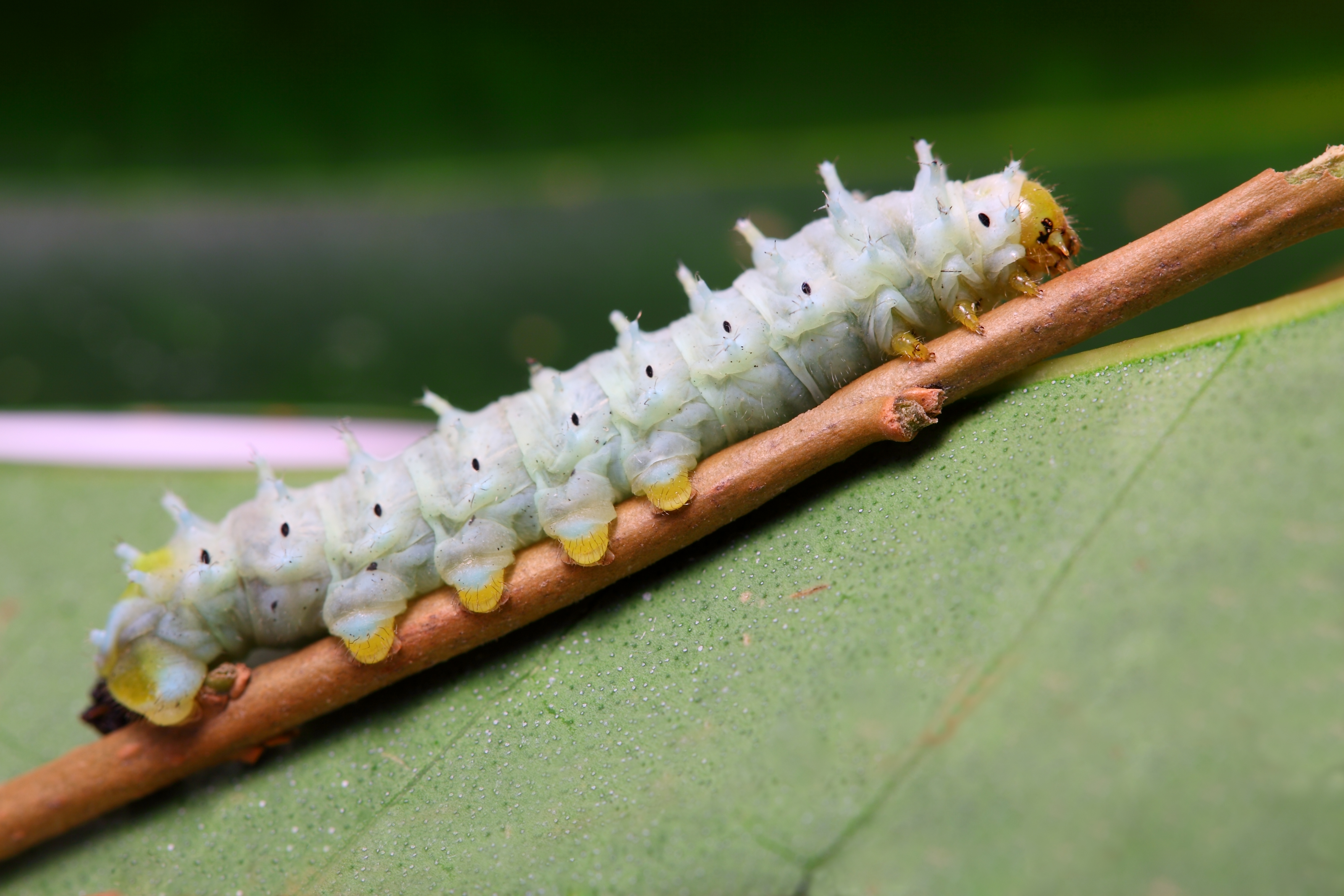
Eri silkworm

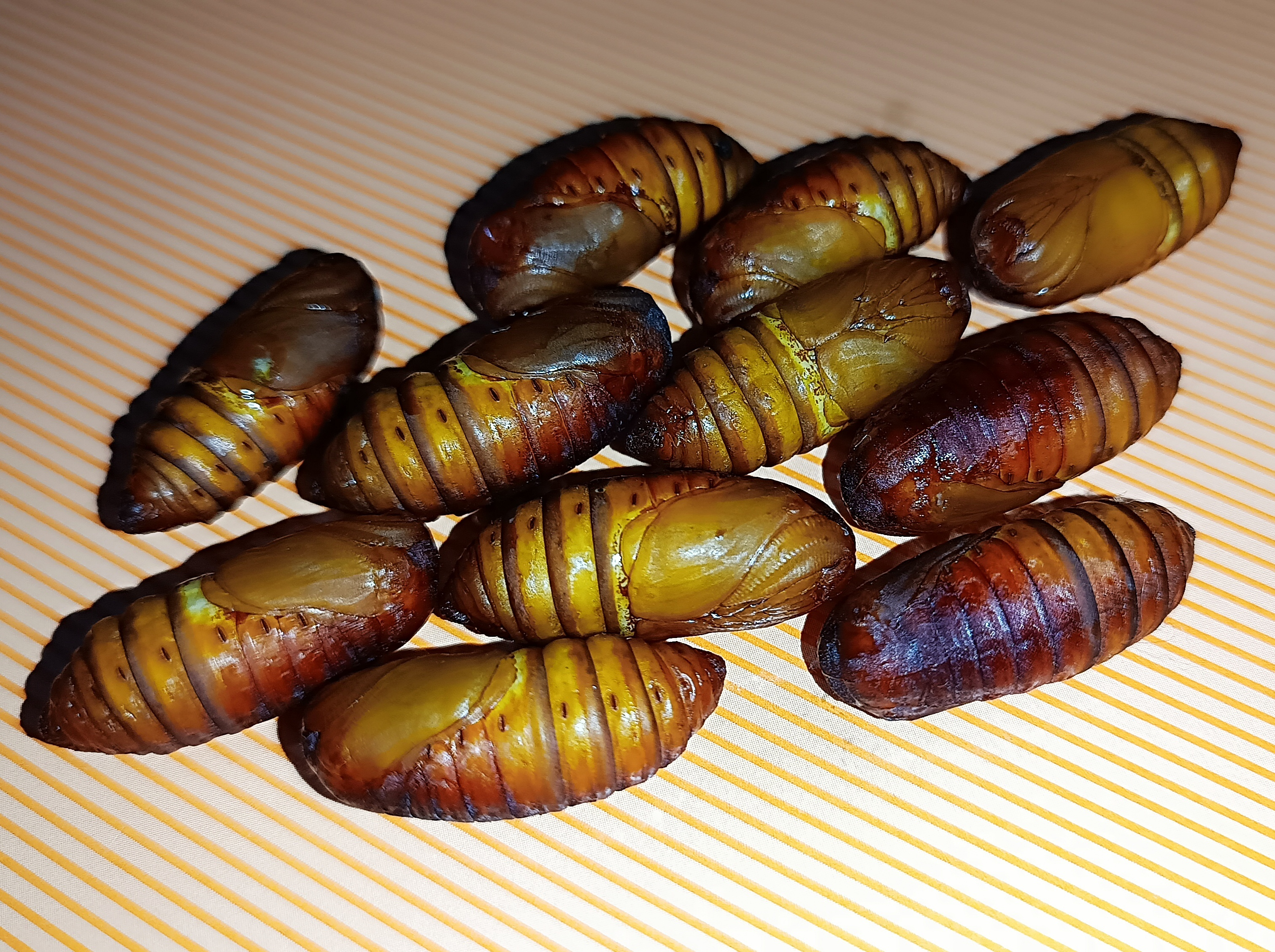
Pupa of Eri silkworm
