= James A. Anderson =

James A. Anderson may refer to:

- James Allan Anderson (chess player) (1906–1991), American chess player
- James Arthur Anderson (born 1955), American writer
- James A. Anderson (academic administrator), chancellor of Fayetteville State University
- James A. Anderson (cognitive scientist) (born 1940), American professor of cognitive science and brain science

== See also ==
- James A. Andersen (1924–2022), American politician and judge in the state of Washington
