= Jim Anderson =

Jim Anderson may refer to:

== Sports ==
- Jim Anderson (American football) (born 1947), American football player and coach
- Jim Anderson (baseball) (born 1957), former Major League Baseball player
- Jim Anderson (basketball) (1937–2024), American basketball player and coach
- Jim Anderson (footballer) (1869–1947), Australian rules footballer with Essendon, 1892–1905
- Jim Anderson (ice hockey) (1930–2013), NHL hockey player and coach
- Jim Anderson (swimmer) (born 1963), Scottish swimmer

== Other ==
- Jim Anderson (loyalist) (1931–2019), Northern Irish loyalist
- Jim Anderson (editor) (born 1937), editor of the magazine Oz and author
- Jim Anderson (Australian politician) (1943–2003), New South Wales politician
- Jim Anderson (American politician) (born 1943), Wyoming politician
- Jim Anderson (sound engineer), sound engineer and producer
- Jim Anderson, the title character from the series Father Knows Best

== See also ==
- James Anderson (disambiguation)
- Jimmy Anderson (disambiguation)
- James Andersen (disambiguation)
