= Lyle Norman Long =

Academic and computational scientist

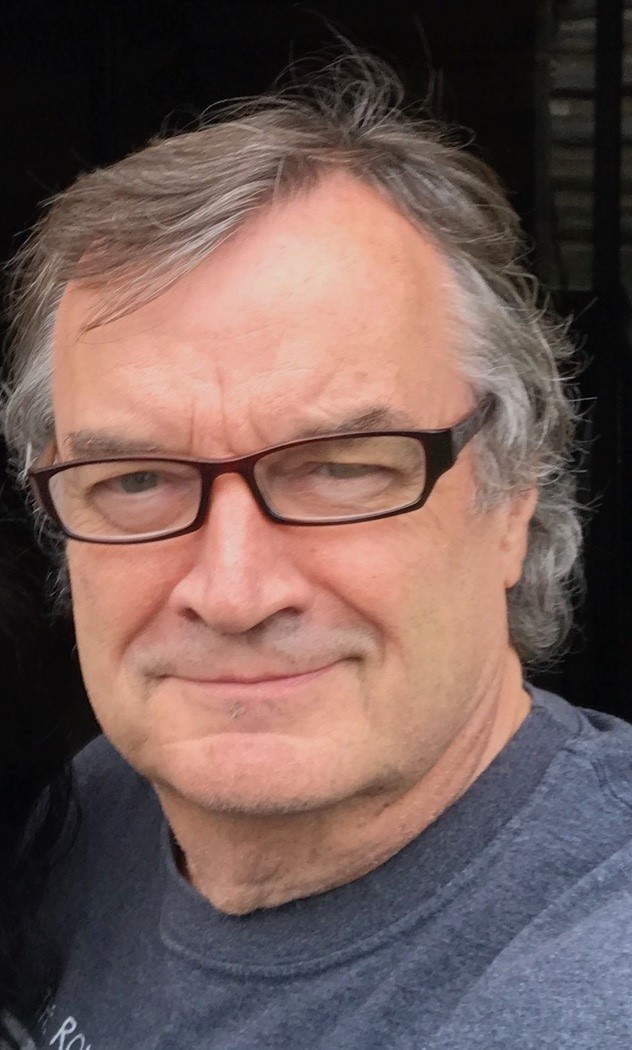
- Born: April 7, 1954 (age 72); Minnesota
- Occupations: Academic, and computational scientist

Academic background
- Education: B.M.E., M.S., and D.Sc.
- Alma mater: University of Minnesota; Stanford University; George Washington University
- Thesis: The Compressible Aerodynamics of Rotating Blades using an Acoustic Formulation (1983)

Lyle Norman Long is an academic, and computational scientist. He is a Professor Emeritus of Computational Science, Mathematics, and Engineering at The Pennsylvania State University, and is most known for developing algorithms and software for mathematical models, including neural networks, and robotics. His research has been focused in the fields of computational science, computational neuroscience, cognitive robotics, parallel computing, and software engineering.

Long is a Fellow of the American Physical Society (APS), and the American Institute of Aeronautics and Astronautics (AIAA). From 2015 till 2018, he held an appointment as an Associate Editor of IEEE Transactions on Neural Networks and Learning Systems (TNNLS). He is the founding editor-in-chief of the Journal of Aerospace Information Systems, and also created and directed the Computational Science Graduate Minor program at the Penn State University.

== Education ==
Long graduated with a Bachelor of Mechanical Engineering with Distinction from the University of Minnesota in 1976. Subsequently, he received Master of Science degree in Aeronautics and Astronautics from Stanford University in 1978. He also holds a Doctor of Science degree from George Washington University. His thesis is titled, "The Compressible Aerodynamics of Rotating Blades using an Acoustic Formulation", which he completed under the supervision of F. Farassat, and M. K. Myers.

== Career ==
During his academic tenure, Long has served at NASA Ames Research Center based in California, and NASA Langley Research Center in Virginia as a research assistant between 1978 and 1983. He has held numerous additional appointments as a visiting scientist at the Army Research Lab, Thinking Machines Corporation, and NASA Langley Research Center. He was also the Gordon Moore Distinguished Scholar at the California Institute of Technology (Caltech) from 2007 till 2008. He is currently a professor emeritus of computational science, mathematics, and engineering at The Pennsylvania State University.

Long has supervised and advised 19 Ph.D. students. In addition to that, he has served as a senior aerodynamics engineer at Lockheed California Company, and also held appointment as a senior research scientist at the Lockheed Aeronautical Systems Company from 1983 to 1989.

== Research ==
Long has over 260 publications under his name including journals and conference papers. His research works are focused on various aspects of applied mathematics, and computational science with a particular emphasis on computational fluid dynamics, modernizing STEM education, artificial intelligence, rarefied gas dynamics, and parallel computing. He showed in many research studies that the object oriented approach of C++ is extremely powerful compared to obsolete approaches such as those using the FORTRAN programming language.

=== Computational fluid dynamics and massively parallel computers ===
Long has extensively focused his research on computational science particularly computational fluid dynamics, and massively parallel computers, and has developed efficient algorithms for solving mathematical model equations. In 1989, he conducted a research study which explained the solution method aimed at the solution of 3D and Navier-Stokes equations with the massively parallel connection machine. He has also solved the Boltzmann equation with the use of Connection Machine, Bhatnagar-Gross-Krook (BGK) model and accurate results were acquired. This led to the Gordon Bell prize in 1993. Later on, he presented an in-depth evaluation of the gas dynamic models, and discussed the Navier-Stokes method and a molecular simulation methods.

Long, along with E. Alpman showed that the Reynolds stress turbulence model was a complete model, he examined separated turbulent flow simulations. Another aspect of computational science that holds prominence in his work is flow-associated noise prediction. He developed a new efficient computational aeroacoustics algorithm for the prediction of aerodynamic noise. He also showed that the four-dimensional integral equation for aeroacoustics can be used to simulate unsteady aerodynamics in the time domain. Together with V. Ahuja, he also developed algorithms and software to solve Maxwell's equations for electromagnetic propagation on parallel computers.

=== Artificial intelligence and neural networks ===
While working on the emotion modeling for mobile robots, he developed a computational model for Temperament and Emotions on Robots. A relationship between emotions, and temperament was built which the previous models on robotics cognitive often overlooked. Having modeled emotions, he implemented the reinforcement effects in his model, so as in the absence of reinforcers emotions return to their standard steady-values. It was demonstrated from his research work that this model carries the potential to be coupled to cognitive architecture, and has been tested, and incorporated into the SS-RICS at the Army Research Laboratory. In 2019, he presented a review of artificial general intelligence (AGI), characterized the current AGI as Narrow AI which focuses on purpose-built applications, formulated by the cumulation of well-recognized algorithms, and proposed a framework as well. Focusing his research on building more intelligent, and autonomous system for the unmanned vehicles, he along with his student, Scott D Hanford built a cognitive robotic system based on the soar cognitive architecture for mobile robot navigation. The cognitive robotic system (CRS) was tested in both outdoor, and indoor navigation missions. For the outdoor setting, it was demonstrated that the Soar agent was able to successfully navigate autonomously to the destination while avoiding obstacles, even with a low information about the environment. It was revealed that the Soar agent had the capability to modify its approach upon the failure of a previous applied approach in avoiding an obstacle. For the indoor search navigation mission, the Soar agent also exhibited success in locating the specific object in the building. This research study highlighted how the implementation of soar in the CRS displayed features of planning, reasoning, intelligent behavior on the autonomous missions, and have implications for the artificial intelligence field. He has also researched possibility of conscious robots with an in-depth analysis on consciousness from the philosophical, neurological, and psychological aspects. It was demonstrated from this research that the hybrid parallel architecture would be befitting for the formulation of conscious robot in order to approximate the complex human brain system.

Long's research works have focused on the neural networks as well. He developed the effective algorithms for the massively-parallel neural networks with the neuron model known as the Hodgkin-Huxley equations. In the research study conducted in 2012, he used C++ and MPI for the efficient scaling up to human-level size networks. Other simple neuron models have failed to accurately simulate the biological neurons. Having discussed that, he also explored the computational costs, and the potential capabilities of neuron models, by reviewing three neuron models namely; Hodgkin–Huxley model, Izhikevich model, and leaky integrate-and-fire model. It was suggested that leaky integrate-and-fire model requires less computations as compared to the Hodgkin–Huxley model but was much too simple, and the Izhikevich model is not useful since it is usually solved using time steps that are unstable and do not actually solve the equations outlined.

=== Rarefied gas dynamics ===
Long has also explored molecular simulations with James Bernhard Anderson, and presented the accurate rate expressions for simulations of gas-phase chemical reactions, as well as predicted the ultrafast detonations with the Monte Carlo simulation method.

=== Modernizing STEM education ===
Long has worked on making STEM education better, and recommends modernizing engineering education. At the 2019 IEEE Aerospace Conference, he presented a research paper that highlighted how Russia, and China are progressing with updated modern discipline whereas US has been too slow to incorporate computing, artificial intelligence, and software systems to their curriculum. He also added that the curriculum highly needs an upgrade with more software engineering certifications, and educational programs.

== Awards and honors ==
- 1987 – Award for "Exceptional personal commitment in advancing excellence of research and development, Lockheed Aeronautical Systems Company
- 1993 – Gordon Bell Prize, IEEE Computer Society
- 1996 – Outstanding Research Award, Penn State Engineering Society
- 2007 – Moore Distinguished Scholar, California Institute of Technology (Caltech)
- 2017 – AIAA Sustained Service Award, American Institute of Aeronautics and Astronautics
- 2017 – AIAA Software Engineering award and medal, American Institute of Aeronautics and Astronautics (AIAA)

=== Selected articles ===
- LONG, L. (1983, July). The aerodynamics of propellers and rotors using an acoustic formulation in the time domain. In Applied Aerodynamics Conference (p. 1821).
- Long, L. N., & Watts, G. A. (1987). Arbitrary motion aerodynamics using an aeroacoustic approach. AIAA journal, 25(11), 1442–1448.
- Long, L. N., Khan, M. M. S., & Sharp, H. T. (1991). Massively parallel three-dimensional Euler/Navier-Stokes method. AIAA journal, 29(5), 657–666.
- Ahuja, V., & Long, L. N. (1997). A Parallel Finite-Volume Runge–Kutta Algorithm for Electromagnetic Scattering. Journal of Computational Physics, 137(2), 299–320.
- Özyörük, Y., Long, L. N., & Jones, M. G. (1998). Time-domain numerical simulation of a flow-impedance tube. Journal of Computational Physics, 146(1), 29–57.
- Anderson, J. B., & Long, L. N. (2003). Direct Monte Carlo simulation of chemical reaction systems: Prediction of ultrafast detonations. The Journal of chemical physics, 118(7), 3102–3110.
- Long, L. N., & Fritz, T. E. (2004). Object-oriented unsteady vortex lattice method for flapping flight. Journal of Aircraft, 41(6), 1275–1290.
- Sezer-Uzol, N., & Long, L. (2006, January). 3-D time-accurate CFD simulations of wind turbine rotor flow fields. In 44th AIAA Aerospace Sciences Meeting and Exhibit (p. 394).
- Hanford, A. D., & Long, L. N. (2009). The direct simulation of acoustics on Earth, Mars, and Titan. The Journal of the Acoustical Society of America, 125(2), 640–650.
- Long, L. N., & Kelley, T. D. (2010). Review of consciousness and the possibility of conscious robots. Journal of Aerospace Computing, Information, and Communication, 7(2), 68–84.
- Long, L. N. (2016). Evolving Curricula for an Exponential World. Educause Review, 51(2).
- Long, L. N. (2016, July). Toward human-level massively-parallel neural networks with Hodgkin-Huxley neurons. In International Conference on Artificial General Intelligence (pp. 314–323). Springer, Cham.
- Long, Lyle N. (2018). "A Model for Temperament and Emotions on Robots". Advances in Human Factors in Robots and Unmanned Systems. Advances in Intelligent Systems and Computing. Vol. 595. pp. 3–13. doi:10.1007/978-3-319-60384-1_1. ISBN 978-3-319-60383-4.
- Long, L. N., & Cotner, C. F. (2019, March). A Review and Proposed Framework for Artificial General Intelligence. In 2019 IEEE Aerospace Conference (pp. 1–10). IEEE.
- Long, L. N., Blanchette, S., Kelley, T. D., & Hohnka, M. (2019, March). The crucial need to modernize engineering education. In 2019 IEEE Aerospace Conference (pp. 1–9). IEEE.
