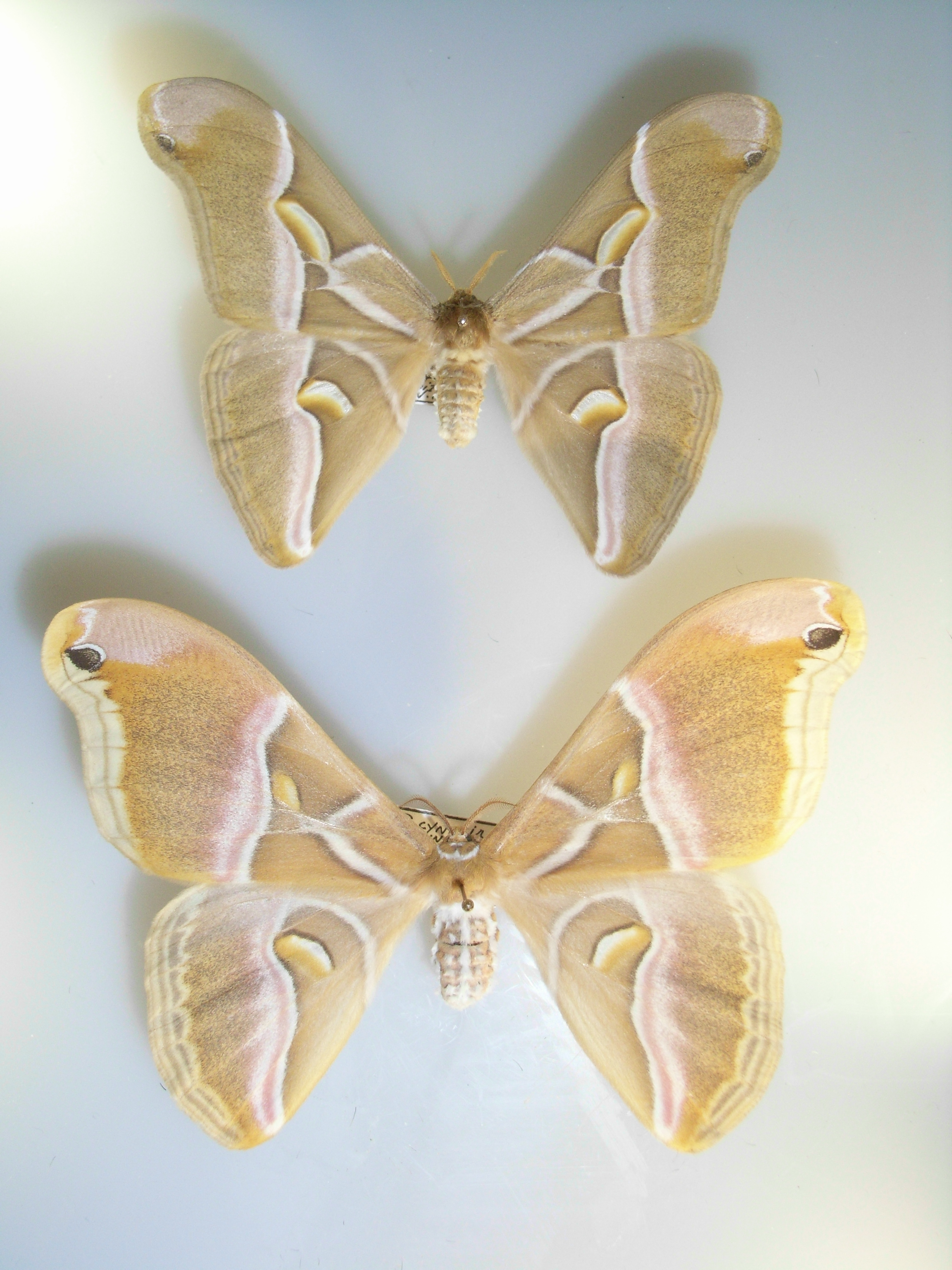
- Bottom: Samia canningi (female), top: Samia cynthia (female)

Scientific classification
- Domain: Eukaryota
- Kingdom: Animalia
- Phylum: Arthropoda
- Class: Insecta
- Order: Lepidoptera
- Family: Saturniidae
- Genus: Samia
- Species: S. canningi

Binomial name
- Samia canningi (Hutton, 1859)

Synonyms
- Saturnia canningi Hutton, 1859; Samia cynthia canningi

= Samia canningi =

Species of moth

Samia canningi, the wild eri silk moth, is a moth of the family Saturniidae. It is found in south-eastern Asia and China.

The wingspan is 100–140 mm (3.9–5.5 in).

The larvae mainly feed on Ailanthus altissima, Prunus laurocerasus, Ligustrum and Syringa species. Pupation takes place in a silken cocoon.

This moth is considered to be the wild ancestor of the domesticated species known as Samia ricini; the latter having been named first, however, the protonym Saturnia canningi Hutton, 1859 has been ruled to be a conserved name and is therefore not treated as a junior synonym of S. ricini.
