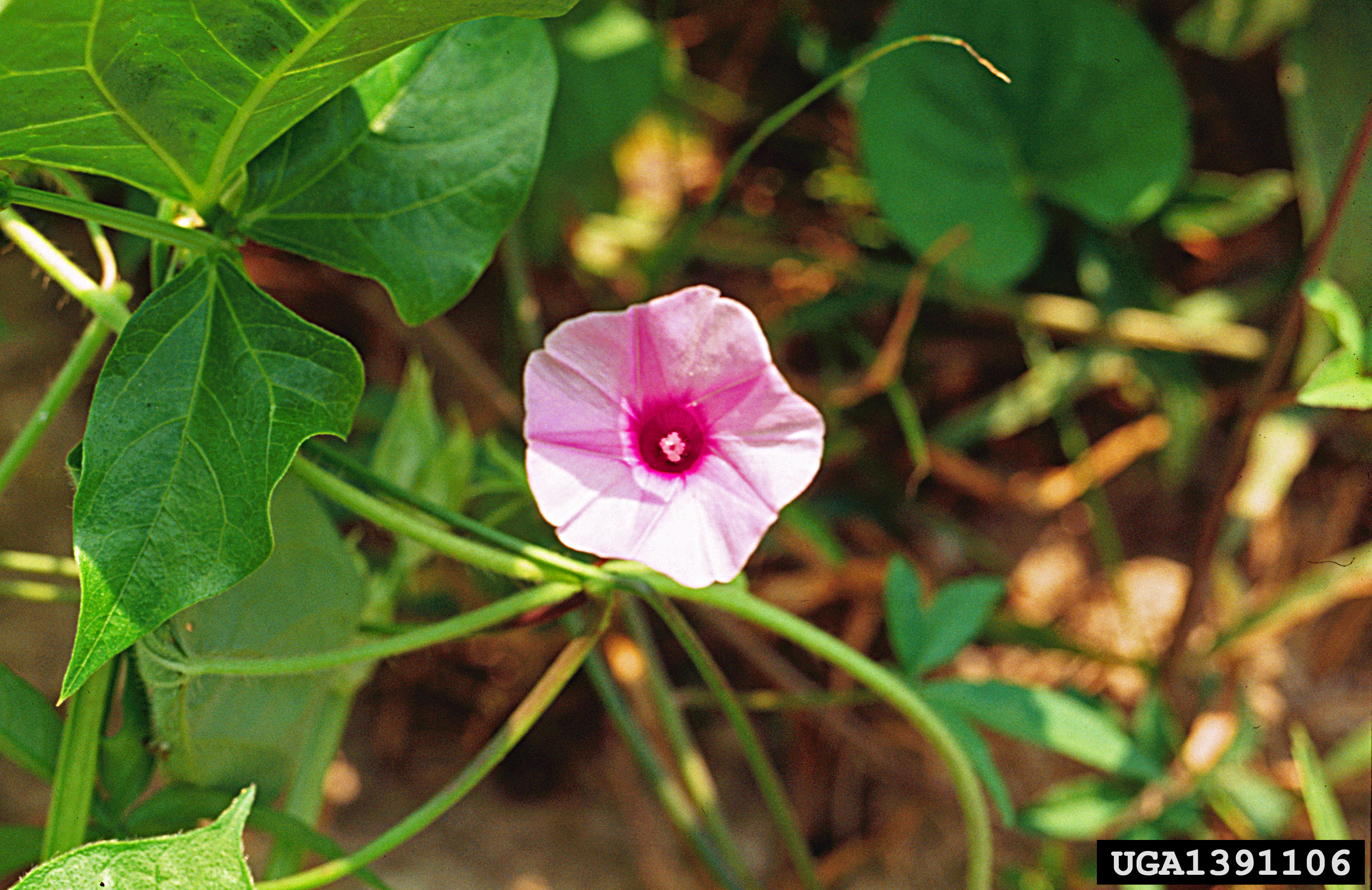

Scientific classification
- Kingdom: Plantae
- Clade: Tracheophytes
- Clade: Angiosperms
- Clade: Eudicots
- Clade: Asterids
- Order: Solanales
- Family: Convolvulaceae
- Genus: Ipomoea
- Species: I. heptaphylla

Binomial name
- Ipomoea heptaphylla Sweet

Synonyms
- Ipomoea wrightii Gray

= Ipomoea heptaphylla =

Species of flowering plant

Ipomoea heptaphylla, sometimes known as Wright's morning glory in the United States, is a species of morning glory. It is incorrectly classified as I. wrightii in American publications, but is incorrectly known as I. tenuipes in Africa and India. It is an annual or short-lived perennial vine which climbs using twining stems, and has pink or purple flowers. The leaf shape is somewhat variable, with individuals possessing compound leaves palmately divided into five leaflets, and lanceolate-leaved individuals occurring in neighbouring populations. The name heptaphylla actually means 'seven-leaved'. This plant has a very extensive distribution, from Texas and adjacent states in the southeastern USA to Misiones in northern Argentina, the Greater Antilles of the Caribbean, India, Sri Lanka and East and Southern Africa. Despite its wide distribution it is uncommon throughout its range. The rediscovery of the presence of the species in India after an absence of over half a century was published in 2014. The species appears to favour dry subtropical to tropical habitats.

== Taxonomy ==
The earliest reference to this plant is thought to likely be an illustration included in the works on the flora of Brazil by Carl Friedrich Philipp von Martius. It was named as Convolvulus heptaphyllus by William Roxburgh, who studied the plant in India in the late 18th century, but never validly described the species. Roxburgh's name was validated in 1803 by Johan Peter Rottler and Carl Ludwig Willdenow in a German publication, based on a specimen collected in Madras, but a 1824 posthumous printing of the Flora Indica -constructed from Roxburgh's edited notes, was incorrectly used in later British works to attribute authorship of the name to him anyway. The original type specimen, the holotype, is stored in Berlin, with an isotype kept at Kew.

Ipomoea wrightii was named by Asa Gray in his Synoptical flora of North America after Charles Wright, an important collector of new species of wild plants in the Republic of Texas, basing his species on plant material collected by Wright. Gray mistakenly attributed the origin of the holotype specimen to "southern Texas", but it had actually been collected by Wright in Cuba. This holotype has always been kept in Germany.

In Africa the plant was known as Convolvulus heptaphyllus until 1961, when Bernard Verdcourt moved the taxon to a new combination, Ipomoea tenuipes, instead of I. heptaphylla, because he believed the name I. heptaphylla was already occupied; in fact the name was indeed occupied, Robert Sweet had already moved Convolvulus heptaphyllus to Ipomoea heptaphylla in 1830, citing the Flora Indica.

== Description ==
It is an annual or short-lived perennial vine. Besides being able to climb using thin stems which wind around the stems of other plants, the leaf petioles and flower peduncles of this species are also able to twist around supporting objects. There are some rough points on the stem and some hairs within the corolla, but otherwise the plant is completely glabruos. The flowers are coloured pink or purple. The leaf shape is somewhat variable, with individuals usually possessing compound leaves palmately divided into five leaflets, but with lanceolate-leaved individuals occurring in neighbouring populations. The name heptaphylla actually means 'seven-leaved'. When palmate the leaflets are all approximately the same size, with the entire leaf being roughly round in dimensions.

It is quite similar to Ipomoea cairica, which occurs throughout much of its range, having similar leaves, flowers and twining petioles, but this is a less robust plant with smaller flowers and much longer peduncles. Furthermore, in I. cairica the flower petals are rounded at their ends as opposed to slightly pointed, and the leaves are somewhat longer than they are broad.

== Distribution ==
Aside from the first references to this species from Brazil, India and Cuba, other early collections of this species are from Jamaica, Paraguay, Tanzania, Sri Lanka, northernmost Mexico, Texas and Arkansas.

Likely the first specimens in India, and indeed the world, were collected near Chennai, then known as Madras, in Marmelon, now Mambalam-Saidapet, in the 'Nopalry', the Opuntia gardens, of the Scottish physician and keen gardener James Anderson, who was (quite unsuccessfully) attempting to develop cochineal farming in India at this location. Herbarium specimens taken from these gardens made their way to Germany, where they were used as the type to base the taxon on in 1803. Another early collection from the geographical area was in Sri Lanka, from which seeds were sent to a lady gardener in England in the 1840s, which were then grown into plants featured in Curtis's Botanical Magazine (under the name Ipomoea pulchella, and dubbed with the vernacular name 'handsome bindweed' for this work). In 2014 it was recollected in India in Aurangabad district, Maharashtra, after not having been identified in the country for 53 years.

In Africa it is known to grow in Angola, Mozambique, Namibia, South Africa (the former Transvaal Province), Sudan (information from before succession), Tanzania (continental), Zambia (Luangwa), and Zimbabwe. The earliest African specimens were collected in Tanganyika in the 1930s. In South Africa it is very uncommon.

Although it had always been seen as native to the United States, with I. wrightii first having been described from Texas, it has recently been added as an invasive species in the US in some internet databases.

== Ecology ==
In India the known habitat of this species is roadsides in cultivated areas.

== Uses ==
Seed of this species has sometimes been offered for sale in commercial horticultural catalogues. It was first cultivated in Britain in 1827.
