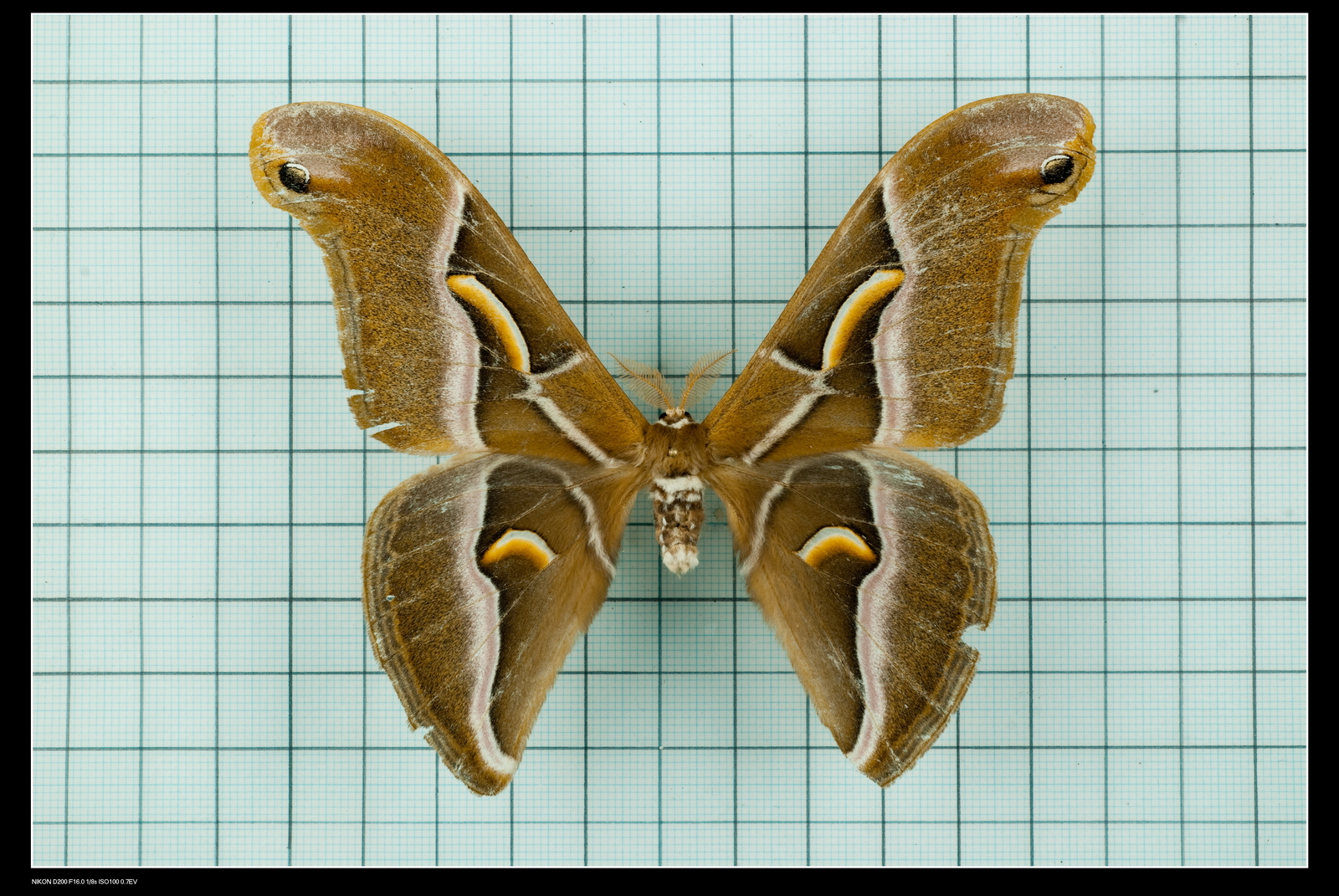

Scientific classification
- Kingdom: Animalia
- Phylum: Arthropoda
- Class: Insecta
- Order: Lepidoptera
- Family: Saturniidae
- Genus: Samia
- Species: S. wangi

Binomial name
- Samia wangi Naumann & Peigler, 2001

= Samia wangi =

Species of moth

Samia wangi, the lesser Atlas moth, is a species of moth in the family Saturniidae. It is found from Taiwan through northern Vietnam to easternmost Tibet, Sichuan, the far south of Shaanxi and southern Zhejiang.

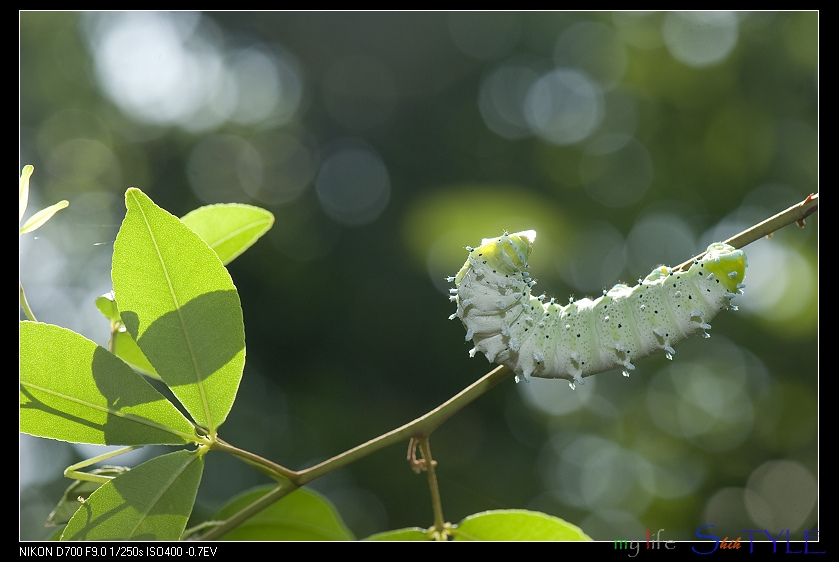
Larva
