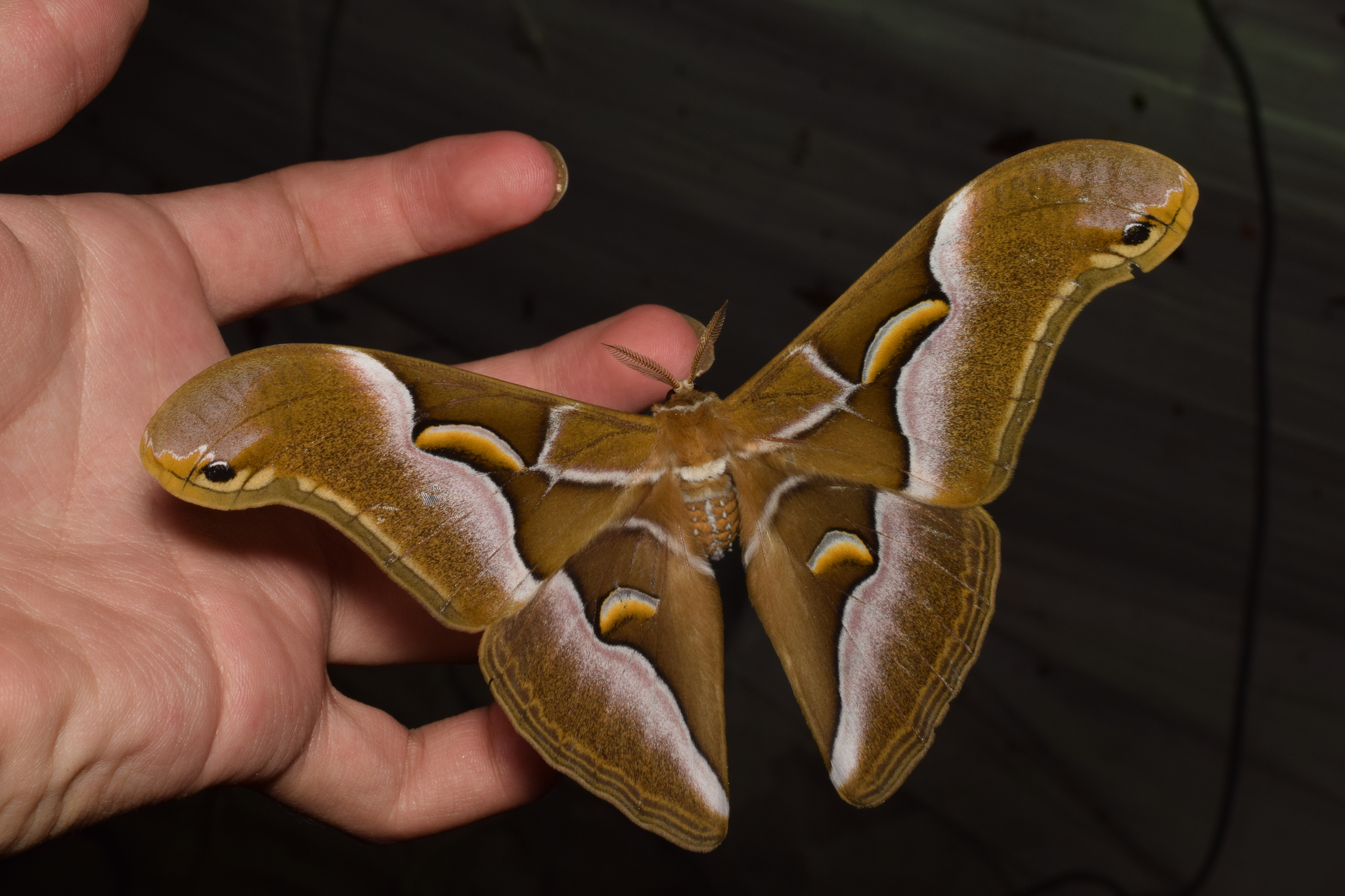
- Samia cynthia

Scientific classification
- Domain: Eukaryota
- Kingdom: Animalia
- Phylum: Arthropoda
- Class: Insecta
- Order: Lepidoptera
- Family: Saturniidae
- Subfamily: Saturniinae
- Tribe: Attacini
- Genus: Samia; Hübner, [1819]

Synonyms
- Philosamia Grote, 1874; Desgodinsia Oberthür, 1914

= Samia (moth) =

Genus of moths

Samia is a genus of moths in the family Saturniidae. The genus was erected by Jacob Hübner in 1819.

== Species ==
- Samia abrerai Naumann & Peigler, 2001
- Samia canningi (Hutton, 1859)
- Samia ceramensis (Bouvier, 1927)
- Samia cynthia (Drury, 1773)
- Samia fulva Jordan, 1911
- Samia insularis (Snellen von Vollenhoven, 1862)
- Samia kohlli Naumann & Peigler, 2001
- Samia luzonica (Watson, 1914)
- Samia naessigi Naumann & Peigler, 2001
- Samia naumanni U. Paukstadt, Peigler & L. Paukstadt, 1998
- Samia peigleri Naumann & Naessig, 1995
- Samia pryeri (Butler, 1878)
- Samia ricini (Donovan, 1798)
- Samia tetrica (Rebel, 1924)
- Samia treadawayi Naumann, 1998
- Samia vandenberghi (Watson, 1915)
- Samia wangi Naumann & Peigler, 2001
- Samia watsoni (Oberthuer, 1914)
- Samia yayukae U. Paukstadt, Peigler & L. Paukstadt, 1993
