= Jamie Anderson =

Jamie Anderson may refer to:

- Jamie Anderson (golfer) (1842–1905), male champion golfer
- Jamie Anderson (musician) (born 1957), female vocalist
- Jamie Anderson (scientist) (born 1971), male Australian organizational theorist
- Jamie Anderson (producer) (born 1985), male British writer, director and producer
- Jamie Anderson (snowboarder) (born 1990), female professional snowboarder
- Jamie Anderson (cinematographer), male American cinematographer
- Jamie Anderson (actor) (born 1989), male American actor in the 2006 film The Contract

== See also ==
- James Anderson (disambiguation)
