= Jimmy Anderson =

Jimmy Anderson may refer to:

- Jimmy Anderson (basketball) (1937–2024), American collegiate basketball player and coach
- Jimmy Anderson (baseball) (born 1976), American MLB player
- Jimmy Anderson (boxer) (1942–2021), British boxer
- Jimmy Anderson (bullfighter) (1953–2008), American bullfighter
- James Anderson (cricketer) (born 1982), English cricketer also known as Jimmy Anderson
- Jimmy Anderson (football manager) (born before 1908), English football manager
- Jimmy Anderson (footballer, born 1913) (1913–1993), English football left back
- Jimmy Anderson (footballer, born 1932) (1932–2019), Scottish footballer
- Jimmy Anderson (legislator), (born 1986), disabled American politician from Wisconsin
- Jimmy Anderson (musician) (1932–2026), Muscogee American painter, musician and preacher

== See also ==
- James Anderson (disambiguation)
- Jim Anderson (disambiguation)
