= James Anderson (missionary) =

James Anderson (fl. 1865–1870) was a Protestant Christian missionary who served with the London Missionary Society during the late Qing Dynasty China. He entered the country in Hong Kong on 27 December 1865 and continued on to Canton in 1867 where he remained through 1870. He and his wife left for England on 5 May 1870 for health reasons.
