= James Anderson (footballer) =

Scottish footballer

Personal information
- Place of birth: Scotland
- Position(s): Outside left

Senior career*
Years	Team	Apps	(Gls)
1910–1915	Queen's Park	50	(4)
- * Club domestic league appearances and goals

James Anderson was a Scottish amateur footballer who played as an outside left in the Scottish League for Queen's Park.

== Personal life ==
Anderson served as a second lieutenant in the Highland Light Infantry during the First World War.

== Career statistics ==
Appearances and goals by club, season and competition
Club	Season	League			Scottish Cup		Other		Total	
Club	Season	Division	Apps	Goals	Apps	Goals	Apps	Goals	Apps	Goals
Queen's Park	1910–11	Scottish First Division	14	1	0	0	0	0	14	1
Queen's Park	1911–12	Scottish First Division	26	2	2	0	1 (Note: Appearance in Glasgow Merchants Charity Cup)	1	29	3
Queen's Park	1912–13	Scottish First Division	10	1	0	0	1 (Note: Appearance in Glasgow Cup)	0	11	1
Career total			50	4	2	0	2	1	54	5
