= James Andersen =

Jim or James Andersen may refer to:

- James Roy Andersen (1904–1945), American Air Force brigadier general
- James A. Andersen (1924–2022), American state legislator and judge in Washington state
- Jim Ronny Andersen (born 1975), Norwegian badminton medalist

== See also ==
- James Anderson (disambiguation)
