= James Anderson (poet and songwriter) =

Scottish poet (1835–1922)

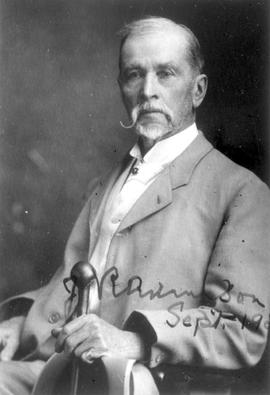
- Born: James Anderson; 18 May 1835; Coupar Angus, Perthshire, Scotland
- Died: 12 September 1922 (aged 87); Doncaster, South Yorkshire, England
- Occupations: Gold miner, farmer
- Writing career
- Genres: Poetry, songwriting

James Anderson (1835–1922) was a Scottish poet and songwriter who emigrated to Canada in 1863 to become a gold miner during the Cariboo Gold Rush. He was the author of Sawney's Letters, the first published work of poetry in British Columbia, as well as other poems and songs. In 1871, he gave up prospecting and returned to Scotland where he took over his father's estate.

== Biography ==
James Anderson was born on 18 May 1835 in Coupar Angus, Scotland. (Note: Biographical dates in other sources are either vague or in error.) His father was a lawyer, banker, and landowner of some prominence. Anderson received a sound education at the Dollar Institute in Dollar, Clackmannanshire. In 1860, he married Lucy Lechmere, and they had a son, David. In 1863, Anderson decided to seek his fortune in the Cariboo Gold Rush of British Columbia.

Anderson bought a mining claim from John Cameron on Williams Creek, the site of the boom town of Barkerville. It returned his investment, but in the spring of 1864 he tried a new claim named Red Gulch that did poorly. He later tried his luck on nearby Lightning Creek as a partner in claims named Ayrshire Lass and Prairie Flower.. Anderson was known locally as "Scotch Jimmie". He was a candidate for the Mining Board and a member of the Williams Creek Fire Brigade. His eight years in the Cariboo were unsuccessful from a financial point of view.

Rather than for mining, Anderson was a well-regarded member of the community due to his attractive personality and pleasant singing voice. In 1865, the newspaper The Cariboo Sentinel wrote, on the occasion of a concert to raise funds for the Glee Club, "Mr. James Anderson created great enthusiasm by his very artistic rendering of several Scottish songs; the rapturous encores that followed each of his songs testified how highly they were appreciated by the audience". Anderson was one of the original members of the Amateur Dramatic Association and he took part in their performances. He also sang at the Theatre Royale in Barkerville.

Anderson left the Cariboo in November 1871, writing a farewell poem for the occasion. He took over his father's estate of Pitfar near Dollar, Clackmannanshire. After his wife Lucy died of breast cancer in 1886, he moved to Tarvit Mill in Fife. He remarried in 1903, to his cousin Catherine Van Someren. Desiring to be closer to his son and grandson, both doctors, Anderson moved to Stainforth in South Yorkshire. He died on 12 September 1922.

== Literary career ==
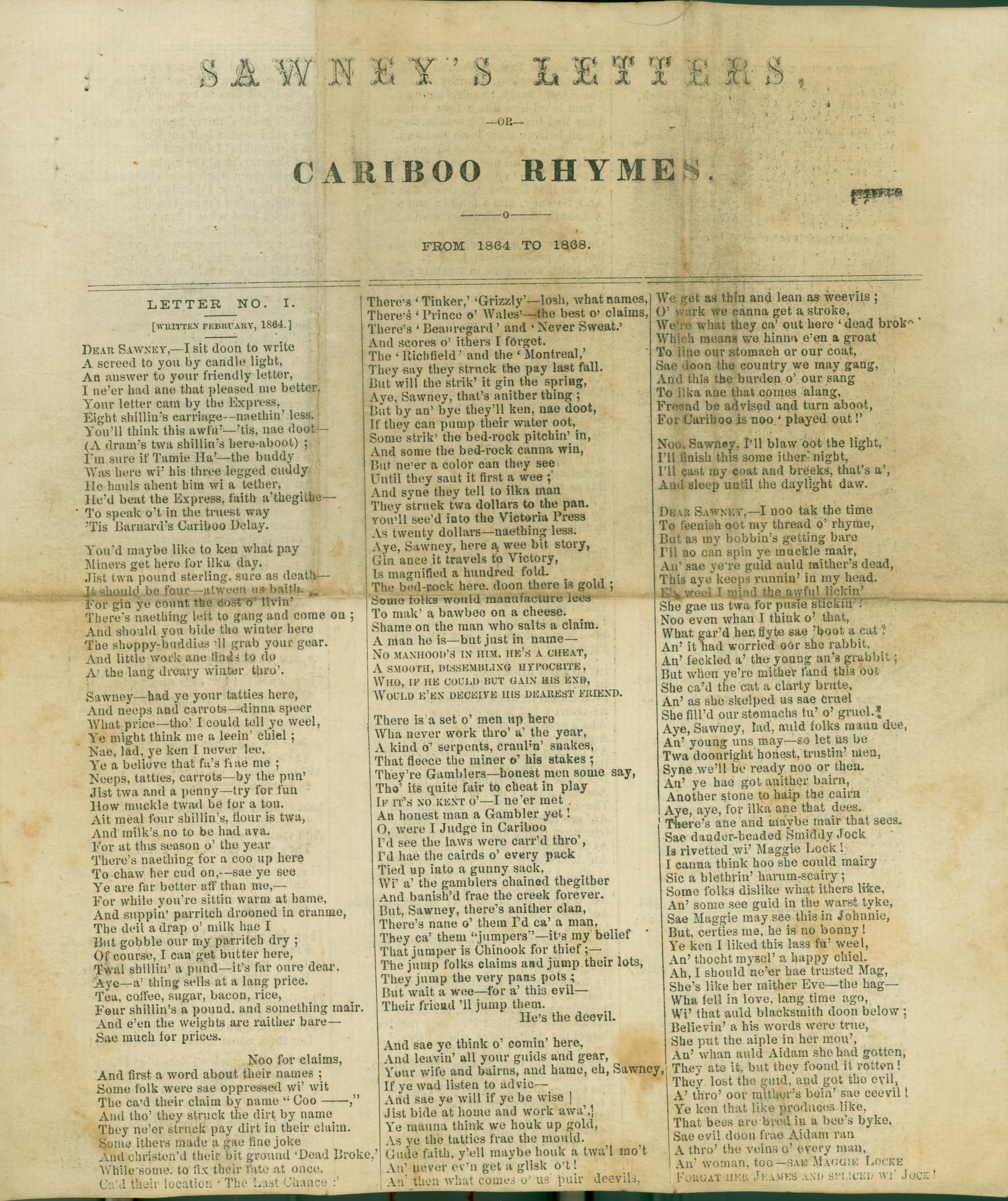
First page of Sawney's Letters, Cariboo Rhymes. 1868. Second edition. Brock University Archives.

The centre of life in Barkerville during the long winter evenings was the public reading room, and Anderson took part in concerts and entertainments held there. Starting in the winter of 1864, he and a friend, John McLaren, edited a weekly manuscript magazine named The Caribooite where original pieces appeared, and these were sometimes printed in the newspaper The Cariboo Sentinel.

In the spring of 1864, Anderson composed a rhyming letter to his friend Sawney in Freuchie, Scotland. It was published in the Cariboo Sentinel on 19 June 1865 while Anderson was living on Williams Creek. Whether Sawney was a real person or an artistic device is not known. The poem was written in broad Scots vernacular and signed "Jeames". In the letter, Anderson writes of the vicissitudes of mining life, such as waiting for the mail from back home, the high cost of food supplies, and the colourful names given to the miners' claims.

A sequel letter to Sawney from The Caribooite was printed on 23 July 1866 in the Cariboo Sentinel newspaper. The editor wrote, "many will readily recognize a truthful history of their own mining experiences". Much of this letter was devoted to the enjoyments of mining society: dancing, drinking, and gambling. A week later, due to popular demand, the Cariboo Sentinel republished the pair of letters in a format suitable for sending in the mail and priced at 50 cents. The printed sheet was the earliest literary publication in British Columbia. No known copy of this first edition of Sawney's Letters survives.

The second, and earliest extant edition, of Sawney's Letters was published by the Cariboo Sentinel, dated 22 June 1868 at Williams Creek. A single sheet folded to make four pages, it now included three letters to Sawney as well as the poem, "Waiting for the Mail". (Note: Note that many commentators apart from Lowther and Bringhurst overlook the lost first edition.) A commentary by a future premier of British Columbia, William Smithe, was effusive in his praise of the poetry, although he lamented that the broad Scots dialect of the letters might not be intelligible to a general readership.

In 1869, a third and considerably enlarged edition was published. It included eight additional contributions to the Sawney series as well as twenty-four pages of Cariboo songs. Besides Anderson's poems and lyrics, other writers were represented, such as Rebecca Gibbs, thought to be a black laundress. She wrote the last poem in the anthology, entitled "The Old Red Shirt". Another feature of the publication are the songs relating to the recent Canadian Confederation and the prospective union of British Columbia with Canada.

Not all of Anderson's songs were written in the Scots dialect, but those that do give the best picture of mining life. He often set his poems in verse to the rhythms of old country tunes. Anderson frequently borrowed the meter and dialect of Robert Burns. His most popular local song was "I Belong to the Fire Brigade", set to the music of "Riding on a Railroad Car".

In 1896, in response to a newspaper article about a fourth edition published in the previous year, Anderson reminisced from Scotland about the old days. He remarked that he was still writing under the pen name "A. Qr. C.". Except for Sawney's Letters, he disavowed his Cariboo songs, saying they were written on the spur of the moment and he would have been pleased if they had been "buried in the tailings of Williams Creek." His sole possession remaining from the Cariboo was an amateur photograph depicting about thirty miners, many known to him by name. Anderson proceeded to write a poem with the lines, "Where are the boys of '63 / When the "boom" was in Cariboo?"

== Legacy ==
In 1962, Sawney's Letters and Cariboo Songs were reprinted in a booklet published by the Barkerville Restoration Advisory Committee.

At the Barkerville Hotel, a display of James Anderson and his music is on display.

In 2000, the folk music duo of Cathryn Wellner and historian Richard Wright recorded songs with Anderson's lyrics.

In the summer of 2023, a play, Sawney's Legacy, written and performed by Brendan Dailey, and directed by Dirk van Stralen, was performed at the Sunset Theatre in Wells, British Columbia.

== Sources ==
- Bringhurst, Robert (1984). Ocean, Paper, Stone: The catalogue of an exhibition of printed objects which chronicle more than a century of literary publishing in British Columbia. William Hoffer. ISBN 0-919758-07-X.
- Elliott, Gordon R. (1978). Barkerville, Quesnel & the Cariboo Gold Rush. Vancouver: Douglas & McIntyre. ISBN 0-88894-179-X.
- Lamb, William Kaye (1950). Sawney's Letters by James Anderson 1868. Toronto: Bibliographical Society of Canada, Reprint Series No. 3.
- Lowther, Barbara (1968). A Bibliography of British Columbia: Laying the Foundations. The University of Victoria – via Internet Archive.
- Wright, Richard Thomas (2013). Barkerville and the Cariboo Goldfields. Heritage House Publishing Co. Ltd. ISBN 978-1-927527-06-1.
