= James Anderson (Royal Navy officer) =

Captain James Anderson
- Born: September 1765
- Died: 24 December 1835 (aged 69–70)
- Military career
- Allegiance: United Kingdom
- Branch: Royal Navy
- Service years: c. 1776 – 1815
- Rank: Captain
- Commands: HMS Rinaldo; HMS Zealous
- Conflicts: American Revolutionary War; French Revolutionary Wars; Napoleonic Wars; War of 1812

James Anderson (September 1765 – 30 December 1835), was an officer of the Royal Navy, who rose to the rank of captain.

== Biography ==
James Anderson served through the American War of Independence as a midshipman, and after the end of the war, joined the colonial service in the West Indies. He married Jane Anne Thornhill in September 1790, and rejoined the navy in 1793 with the outbreak of the French Revolutionary Wars, and was made lieutenant. He was promoted to commander in 1806, and spent some years as agent of transports, after which he commanded the brig-sloop HMS Rinaldo, operating in the English Channel against privateers. He became the senior officer on the coast between Calais and Boulogne in 1811, until being promoted to post-captain in 1812.

In August 1814 Anderson was appointed to the 74-gun HMS Zealous, and sent out with stores to Quebec, where he was ordered to dismantle the rigging and remove her guns, sending them on to the forces on the Great Lakes. He was then to winter at Quebec. The ship was old and rotten, short of its full crew complement, and inadequately equipped. Captain Anderson, judging that it was impossible to stay at Quebec without sacrificing the ship, returned to England; on the charge of this action being contrary to his orders, he was tried by court martial. Lord Melville, then First Lord of the Admiralty, criticised Anderson's decision, telling him that "If Canada fall, it will be entirely owing to your not wintering the Zealous at Quebec"; to which Anderson replied: "I rather think it will be in consequence of proper supplies, in proper ships, not having been sent out there at a proper season of the year". Naval historian John Knox Laughton read into Melville's response the intention to sacrifice Zealous in order to provide an excuse should British forces in Canada suffer a defeat, and was not pleased with Anderson's thwarting his plan. Anderson was acquitted of the charges at the court martial, but due to the drawdown of the navy in 1815 after the end of the Napoleonic Wars, he did not serve again at sea.

== Works ==
Anderson engaged in various scientific and literary pursuits, and was said to have contributed several articles to magazines, though the only one he signed was "Some Observations on the Peculiarity of the Tides between Fairleigh and Dungeness", which was published in the Philosophical Transactions of the Royal Society in 1819. He died on 24 December 1835.
