= James Anderson (biomedical engineer) =

American academic

James M. Anderson is an American professor of pathology, macromolecular science and biomedical engineering at Case Western Reserve University. He received the Elsevier Biomaterials Gold Medal for the most significant contributions to biomaterials science by an individual from 1980 to 2005. He has been a leader in the development of prosthetics, and has been called an "internationally recognized scientist who has made pioneering and significant advancements in the understanding of the inflammatory cell biology of tissue interactions with biomaterials and implantable medical devices." Anderson has served as a president of both the Society for Biomaterials and the Controlled Release Society.

He has been elected to the Institute of Medicine of the National Academies. He was also elected as a member into the National Academy of Engineering in 2013 for contributions to understanding tissue/biomaterials interactions for designing and testing medical devices.

Throughout his career he has worked closely with the NIH, the Food and Drug Administration, the International Organization for Standardization, and the American Institute for Medical and Biological Engineering.

He was educated at the University of Wisconsin–Eau Claire and at Oregon State University.
