= James Anderson (Australian cricketer) =

Australian cricketer

Personal information
- Full name: James William Falconer Anderson
- Born: 25 February 1889; Queensland, Australia
- Died: 8 December 1951 (aged 62); Bellevue Hill, New South Wales, Australia
- Batting: Right-handed

Domestic team information
- Years: Team
- 1919–1920: Queensland

Career statistics
Competition	FC
Matches	2
Runs scored	36
Batting average	9.00
100s/50s	0/0
Top score	36
Balls bowled	274
Wickets	5
Bowling average	39.00
5 wickets in innings	0
10 wickets in match	0
Best bowling	4/88
Catches/stumpings	2/–
- Source: Cricinfo, 18 June 2022

James William Falconer Anderson (25 February 1889 – 8 December 1951) was an Australian cricketer. He played in two first-class matches for Queensland in 1919/20.

== See also ==
- List of Queensland first-class cricketers
