= James M. Anderson (hospital executive) =

American politician

James M. Anderson served as the president and chief executive officer at Cincinnati Children's Hospital Medical Center from 1996 to 2009. He was also chairman of the board of the Cincinnati Branch of the Federal Reserve Bank of Cleveland. In July 2005, Anderson was appointed to a national advisory commission on Medicaid reform, while two years earlier, he was appointed to Ohio Governor Bob Taft's Third Frontier Advisory Board.

Anderson is a former mayor of The Village of Indian Hill, Ohio, and is a graduate of Yale University (1963) and Vanderbilt University Law School (1966). He was a captain in the U.S. Army (1966–1968) during the Vietnam War.
