= James B. Anderson =

American chemist and physicist (1935–2021)

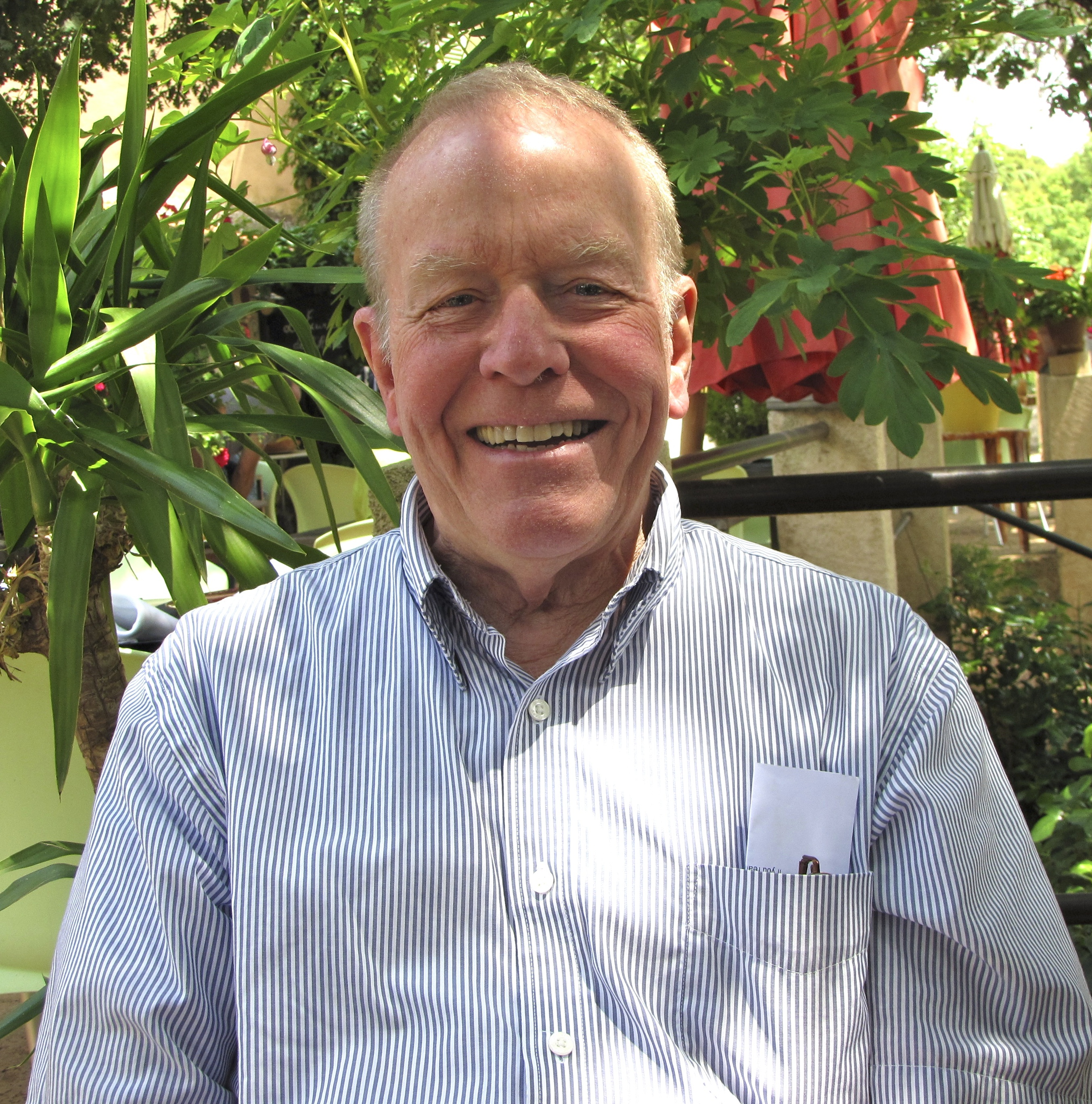
- Born: November 16, 1935; Cleveland, Ohio
- Died: January 14, 2021 (age 85); State College, Pennsylvania
- Occupations: Chemist and Physicist
- Website: www.personal.psu.edu/jba/

James Bernhard Anderson (November 16, 1935 – January 14, 2021) was an American chemist and physicist. From 1995 to 2014 he was Evan Pugh Professor of Chemistry and Physics at the Pennsylvania State University. He specialized in Quantum Chemistry by Monte Carlo methods, molecular dynamics of reactive collisions, kinetics and mechanisms of gas phase reactions, and rare-event theory.

== Life ==
James Anderson was born in 1935 in Cleveland, Ohio to American-born parents of Swedish descent, Bertil and Lorraine Anderson. He was raised in Morgantown, West Virginia and spent his childhood summers on the island of Put-in-Bay, Ohio.

Anderson earned a B.S. in chemical engineering from the Pennsylvania State University, an M.S. from the University of Illinois, and an M.A. and Ph.D. from Princeton University.

Anderson married his wife Nancy Anderson (née Trotter) in 1958. They have three children and six grandchildren.

He died on January 14, 2021, in State College, Pennsylvania.

== Career ==
Anderson began his professional career as an engineer in petrochemical research and development with Shell Chemical Company from 1958 to 1960 in Deer Park, Texas. He began his academic career as a professor of chemical engineering at Princeton University in 1964 and continued as a professor of engineering at Yale University in 1968 before moving to the Pennsylvania State University in 1974. From 1995 until his retirement in 2014, he was Evan Pugh Professor of Chemistry and Physics at the Pennsylvania State University. Anderson also served as a visiting professor at Cambridge University, the University of Milan, the University of Kaiserslautern, the University of Göttingen, Free University of Berlin, and RWTH Aachen University.

== Research ==
Anderson made key contributions in several areas of chemistry and physics. The main areas of impact are: reaction kinetics and molecular dynamics, the 'rare-event' approach to chemical reactions, Quantum Monte Carlo (QMC) methods, Monte Carlo simulation of radiative processes, and direct Monte Carlo simulation of reaction systems.

Anderson's first contributions were experimental and theoretical in the area of nozzle-source molecular beams (supersonic beams) and the free jet fuels and skimmers for generating such beams. This research contributed to success in generating molecular beams of high energy and narrow velocity distributions.

Anderson's experiments with supersonic beams for the reaction HI + HI → H_{2} + I_{2} led him to early studies using classical trajectory methods. He carried out the first calculations of the F-H-H system with a study of the energy requirements for the reaction H + HF → H_{2} + F and followed this work with calculations for F + H_{2} → HF + H, a reaction basic to the understanding of molecular dynamics.

Trajectory calculations for the HI + HI reaction, a rare event, led to his work on predicting rare events in molecular dynamics by sampling trajectories crossing a surface in phase space. Initially called "variational theory of reaction rate" by James C. Keck (1960), it has since 1973 often been called "the reactive flux method." Anderson extended Keck's original method and defended it against a number of critics. The earliest applications were to three- and four-body reactions, but it has been extended to reactions in solution, to condensed matter, to protein folding, and most recently to enzyme-catalyzed reactions.

Anderson pioneered the development of the quantum Monte Carlo (QMC) method of simulating the Schrödinger equation. His 1975–76 papers were the first to describe applications of random walk methods to polyatomic systems and many-electron systems. Today, QMC methods are often the methods of choice for high accuracy for a range of systems: small and large molecules, molecules in solution, electron gas, clusters, solid materials, vibrating molecules, and many others.

Anderson succeeded in bringing the power of modern computers to the direct simulation of reacting systems. His extension of an earlier method for rarefied gas dynamics by Graeme Bird (1963) eliminates the use of differential equations and treats reaction kinetics on a probabilistic basis collision-by-collision. It is the method of choice for many low-density systems with coupled relaxation and reaction, and with non-equilibrium distributions. It has been applied to the complete simulation of detonations as well as to the prediction of ultra-fast detonations.

== Awards and honors ==
- Bausch & Lomb Award
- Evan Pugh Medal (Silver), The Pennsylvania State University
- Evan Pugh Medal (Gold), The Pennsylvania State University
- National Science Foundation Graduate Fellowship
- Fellow of the American Physical Society (1988)
- Fellow of the American Association for the Advancement of Science
- Faculty Scholar Medal, The Pennsylvania State University
- Senior Research Award, Alexander von Humboldt Foundation, Bonn, Germany

== Selected publications ==
See The Anderson Group webpage for a full list of publications.

=== Molecular Beams and Free Jets (Supersonic Beams) ===
- Anderson, J. B.; Fenn, J. B. (1965). "Velocity Distributions in Molecular Beams from Nozzle Sources". Phys. Fluids. 8 (5): 780–787. Bibcode:1965PhFl....8..780A. doi:10.1063/1.1761320.
- Abuaf, N.; Anderson, J. B.; Andres, R. P.; Fenn, J. B.; Marsden, D. G. H. (1967). "Molecular Beams with Energies Above One Electron Volt". Science. 155 (3765): 997–999. Bibcode:1967Sci...155..997A. doi:10.1126/science.155.3765.997. PMID 17830486. S2CID 32104868.
- Anderson, J. B.; Davidovits, P. (1975). "Isotope Separation in a Seeded Beam". Science. 187 (4177): 642–644. Bibcode:1975Sci...187..642A. doi:10.1126/science.187.4177.642. PMID 17810060. S2CID 28655608.

=== Classical Trajectory Calculations ===
- Anderson, J. B. (1970). "Energy Requirements for Chemical Reaction: H + HF → H_{2} + F". J. Chem. Phys. 52 (7): 3849–50. Bibcode:1970JChPh..52.3849A. doi:10.1063/1.1673576.
- Jaffe, R. L.; Anderson, J. B. (1971). "Classical Trajectory Analysis of the Reaction F + H_{2} → HF + H". J. Chem. Phys. 54 (5): 2224–2236. Bibcode:1971JChPh..54.2224J. doi:10.1063/1.1675156.

=== Rare Event Theory (Combined Phase-Space Trajectory Method) ===
- Anderson, J. B. (1973). "Statistical Theories of Chemical Reactions. Distributions in the Transition Region". J. Chem. Phys. 58 (10): 4684. Bibcode:1973JChPh..58.4684A. doi:10.1063/1.1679032.
- Jaffe, R. L.; Henry, J. M.; Anderson, J. B. (1973). "Variational Theory of Reaction Rates: Application to F + H_{2} ⇔ HF + H". J. Chem. Phys. 59 (3): 1128. doi:10.1063/1.1680158.
- Anderson, J. B. (1975). "A Test of the Validity of the Combined Phase-Space/Trajectory Method". J. Chem. Phys. 62 (6): 2446. Bibcode:1975JChPh..62.2446A. doi:10.1063/1.430721.
- Jaffe, R. L.; Henry, J. M.; Anderson, J. B. (1976). "Molecular Dynamics of the Hydrogen Iodide and Hydrogen-Iodine Exchange Reactions". J. Am. Chem. Soc. 98 (5): 1140–1155. Bibcode:1976JAChS..98.1140J. doi:10.1021/ja00421a016.
- Anderson, J. B. (1995). "Predicting Rare Events in Molecular Dynamics". Advances in Chemical Physics. 91: 381.

=== Quantum Monte Carlo ===
- Anderson, J. B. (1975). "A Random-Walk Simulation of the Schrödinger Equation: H_{3}^{+}". J. Chem. Phys. 63 (4): 1499. Bibcode:1975JChPh..63.1499A. doi:10.1063/1.431514.
- Anderson, J. B. (1976). "Quantum Chemistry by Random Walk: H ^{2}P, H_{3}^{+} D_{3h} ^{1}A_{1}, H_{2} ^{3}Σ_{u}^{+}, Be ^{1}S". J. Chem. Phys. 65 (10): 4121–4127. Bibcode:1976JChPh..65.4121A. doi:10.1063/1.432868.
- Anderson, J. B. (1979). "Quantum Chemistry by Random Walk: H_{4} Square". International Journal of Quantum Chemistry. 15: 109–120. doi:10.1002/qua.560150111.
- Garmer, D. R.; Anderson, J. B. (1988). "Potential Energies for the Reaction F + H_{2} → HF + H by the Random Walk Method". J. Chem. Phys. 89 (5): 3050. Bibcode:1988JChPh..89.3050G. doi:10.1063/1.454960.
- Diedrich, D. L.; Anderson, J. B. (1992). "An Accurate Monte Carlo Calculation of the Barrier Height for the Reaction H + H_{2} → H_{2} + H". Science. 258 (5083): 786–788. doi:10.1126/science.258.5083.786. PMID 17777031. S2CID 31105184.
- Sokolova, S.; Lüechow, A.; Anderson, J. B. (2000). "Energetics of Carbon Clusters C_{20} from All-Electron Quantum Monte Carlo Calculations". Chem. Phys. Lett. 323 (3–4): 229–233. Bibcode:2000CPL...323..229S. doi:10.1016/S0009-2614(00)00554-6.
- J. B. Anderson, (Book) Quantum Monte Carlo: Origins, Development, Applications, Oxford University Press, 2007. ISBN 0195310101.

=== Simulation of Radiative Processes ===
- Anderson, J. B.; Maya, J.; Grossman, M. W.; Lagushenko, R.; Waymouth, J. F. (1985). "Monte Carlo Treatment of Resonance Radiation Imprisonment in Fluorescent Lamps". Phys. Rev. A. 31 (5): 2968–2975. Bibcode:1985PhRvA..31.2968A. doi:10.1103/PhysRevA.31.2968. PMID 9895851.

=== Direct Simulation of Chemical Reactions ===
- Anderson, J. B.; Long, L. N. (2003). "Direct Monte Carlo Simulation of Chemical Reaction Systems: Prediction of Ultrafast Detonations". J. Chem. Phys. 118 (7): 3102–3110. Bibcode:2003JChPh.118.3102A. doi:10.1063/1.1537242.

=== Simulations of Enzyme-Catalyzed Reactions ===
- Anderson, J. B.; Anderson, L. E.; Kussmann, J. (2010). "Monte Carlo Simulations of Single and Multistep Enzyme-Catalyzed Reaction Sequences: Effects of Diffusion, Cell Size, Enzyme Fluctuations, Co-localization, and Segregation". Journal of Chemical Physics. 133 (3): 034104. Bibcode:2010JChPh.133c4104A. doi:10.1063/1.3459111. PMID 20649305.
- Nangia, S.; Anderson, J. B. (2011). "Temperature effects on enzyme-catalyzed reactions within a cell: Monte Carlo simulations for coupled reaction and diffusion". Chemical Physics Letters. 556: 372–375. doi:10.1016/j.cplett.2012.11.079.
