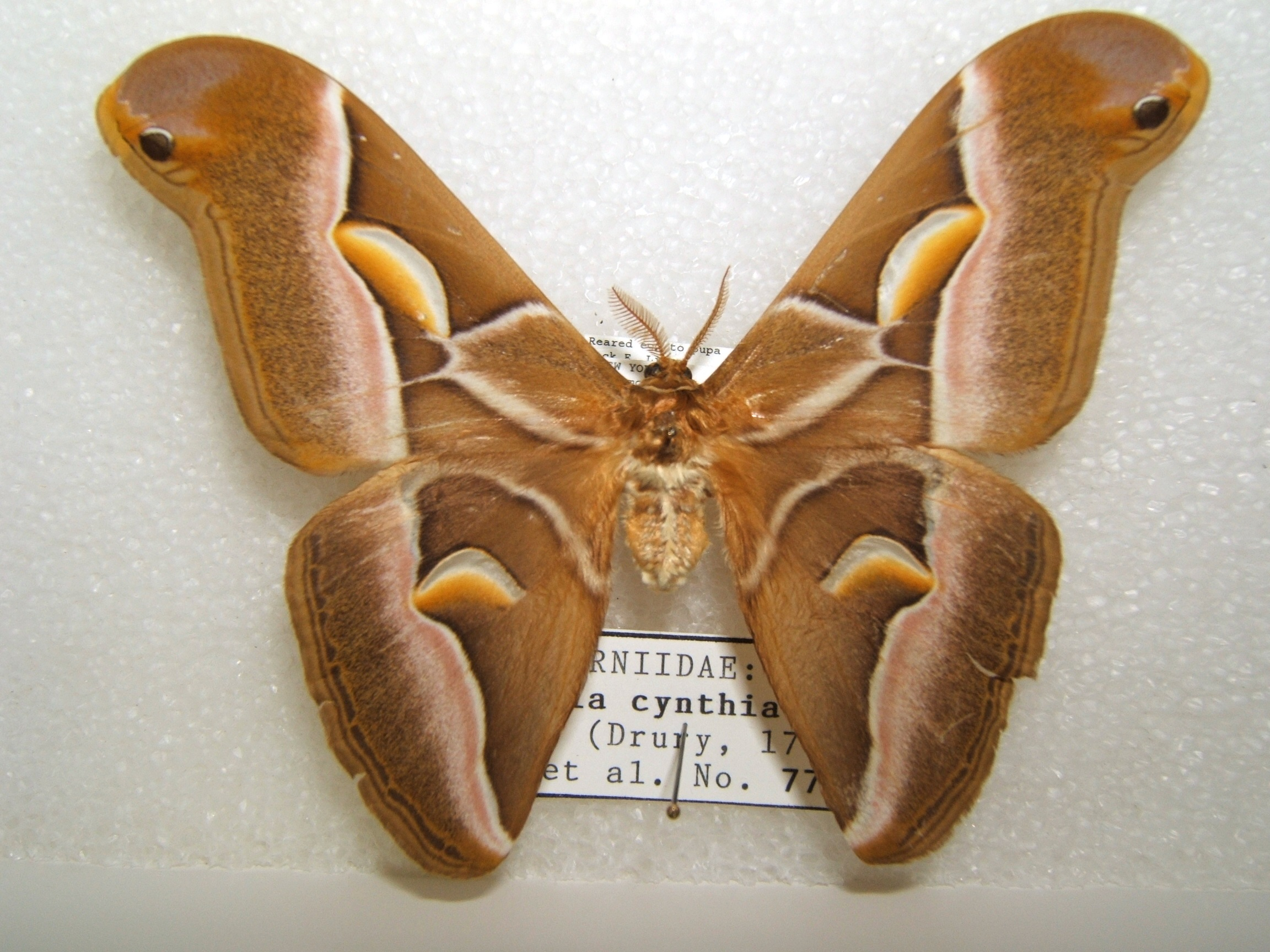

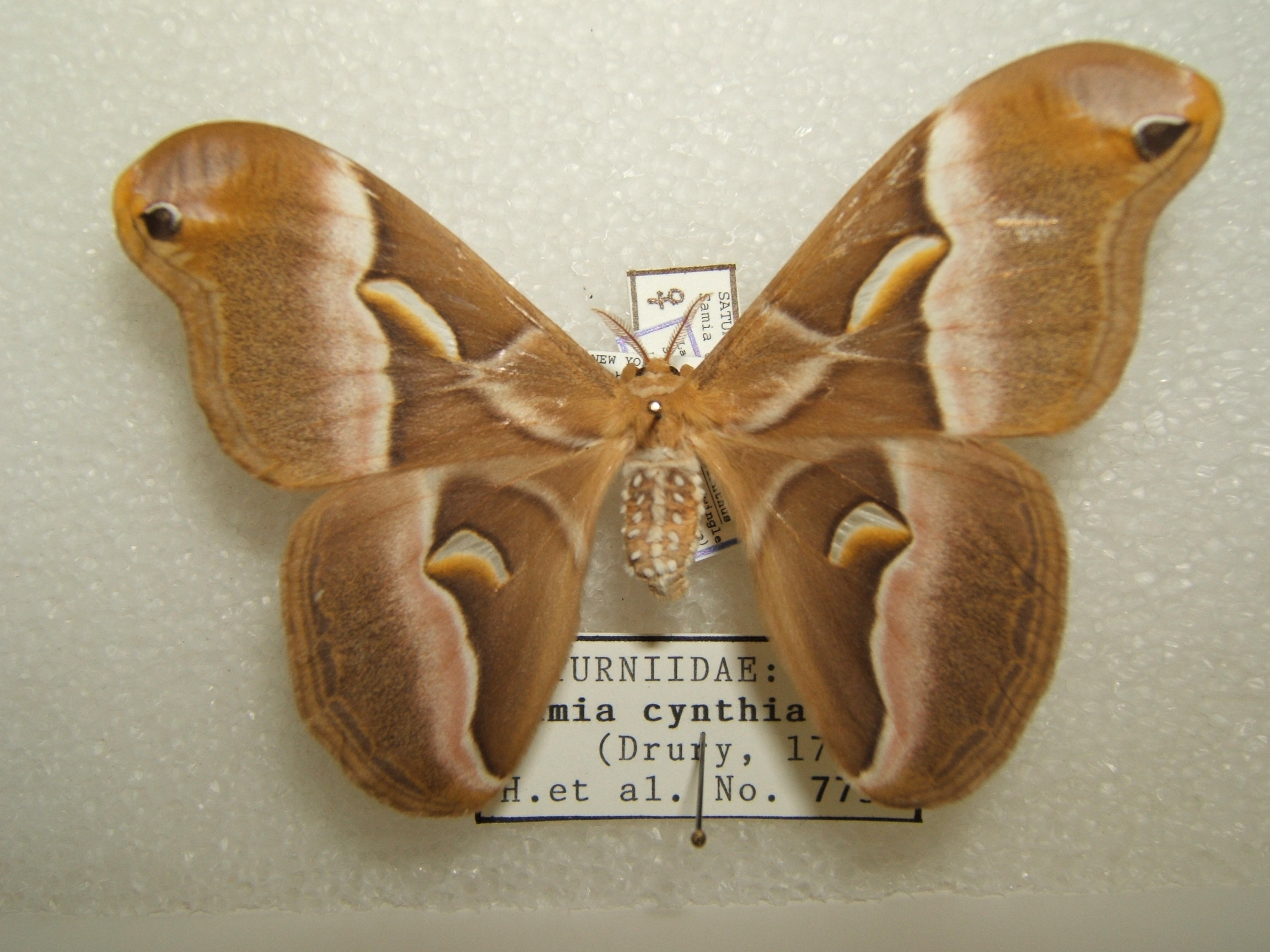
- Adult male and female

Scientific classification
- Kingdom: Animalia
- Phylum: Arthropoda
- Clade: Pancrustacea
- Class: Insecta
- Order: Lepidoptera
- Family: Saturniidae
- Genus: Samia
- Species: S. cynthia

Binomial name
- Samia cynthia (Drury, 1773)

Synonyms
- Phalaena attacus cynthia Drury, 1773; Saturnia aylanti Motschulsky, 1858; Attacus walkeri Felder & Felder, 1862 (in part); Bombyx ailanthi Weil, 1863; Philosamia cynthia Grote, 1874; Philosamia cynthia Rothschild, 1895; Saturnia ailanti Fauvel, 1895; Attacus cynthia var. parisiensis Clément, 1899; Samia cynthia pryeri Jordan, 1911 (in part; misidentification); Philosamia cynthia advena Watson, 1912; Philosamia cynthia eulouvaina Watson, 1914

= Samia cynthia =

Ailanthus silkmoth

Species of moth

Samia cynthia, the ailanthus silkmoth, is a saturniid moth, used to produce silk fabric but not as domesticated as the silkworm, Bombyx mori. The moth has very large wings of 113–125 mm (4.4–4.9 in), with a quarter-moon shaped spot on both the upper and lower wings, whitish and yellow stripes and brown background. There are eyespots on the outer forewings. The species was first described by Dru Drury in 1773.

== Eri silk ==
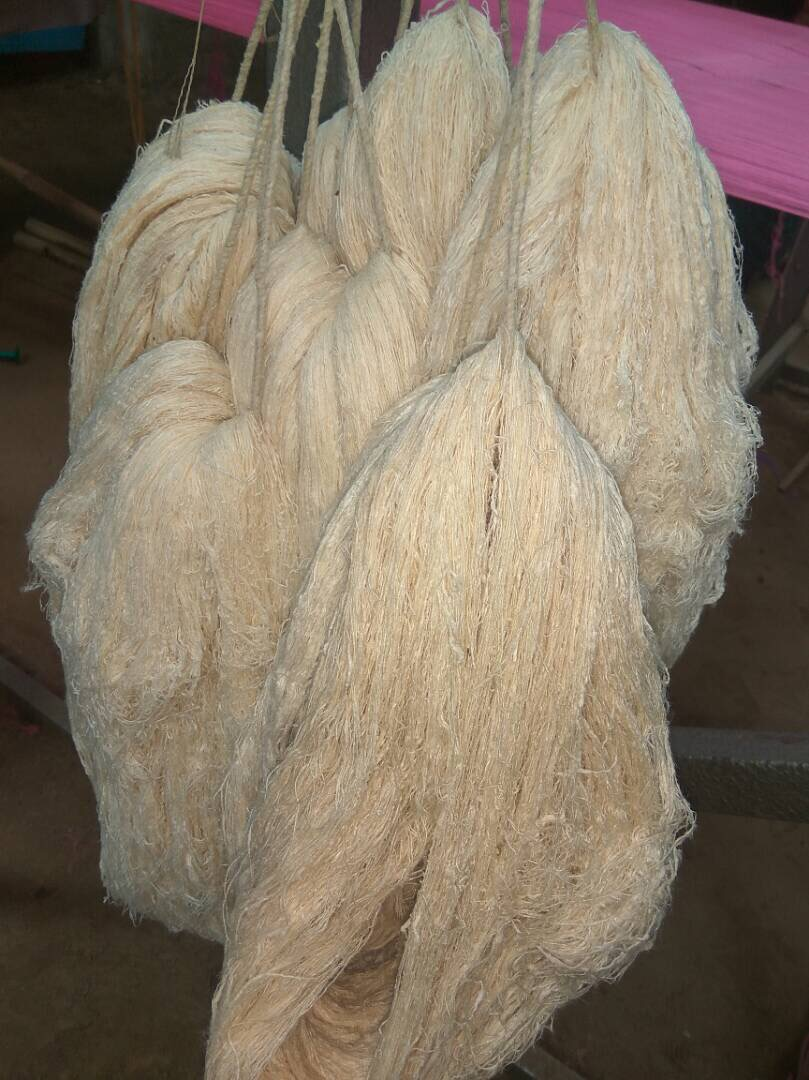
Eri silk fiber

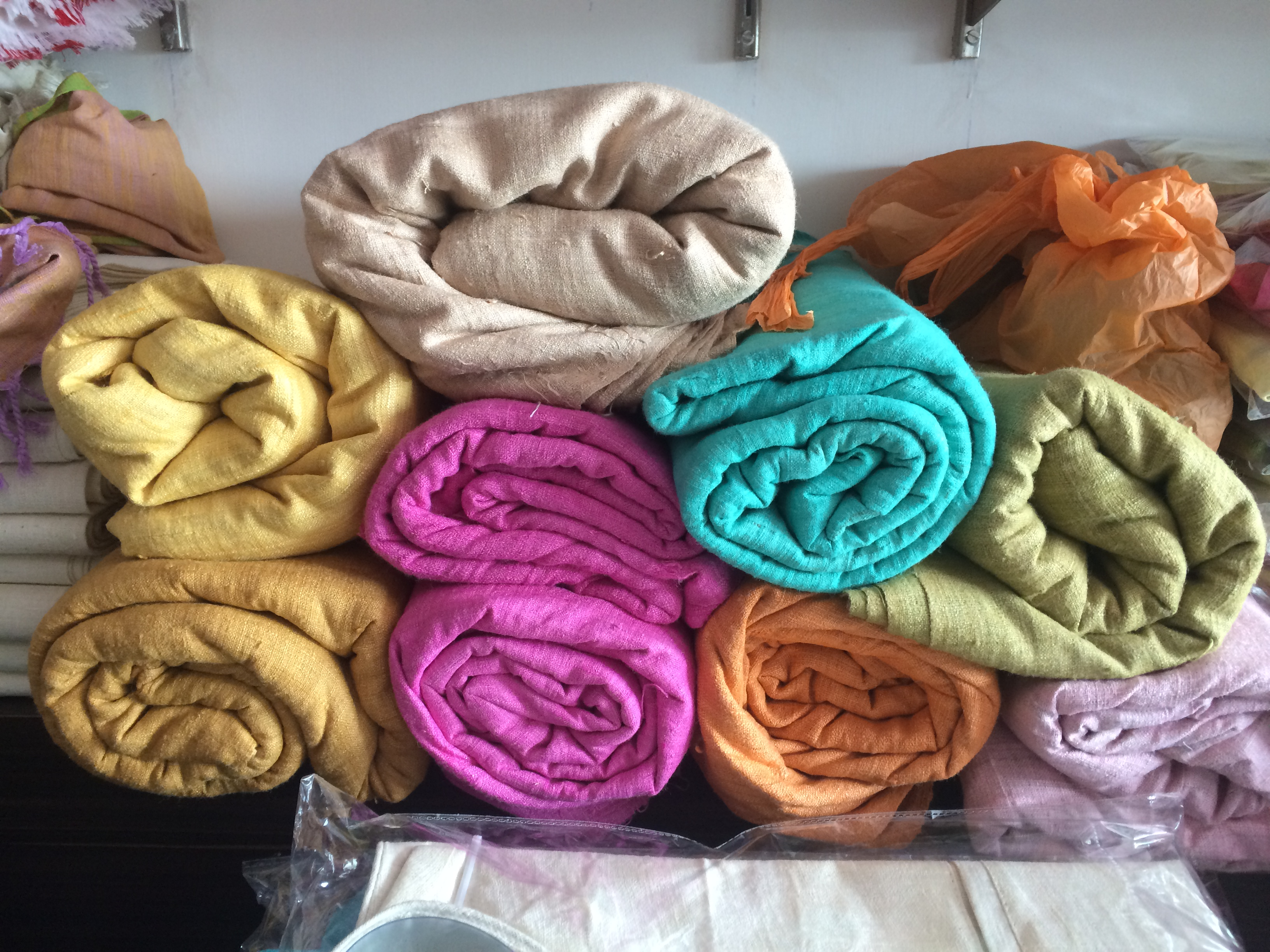
Eri silk clothes

The common name, ailanthus silkmoth, refers to the host plant Ailanthus. There is a subspecies, S. cynthia ricini in India and Thailand that feeds upon the leaves of castor bean (Ricinus communis), and is known for the production of eri silk, and is often referred to by the common name eri silkmoth.

The eri silk worm is the only completely domesticated silkworm other than Bombyx mori. The silk is extremely durable, but cannot be easily reeled off the cocoon and is thus spun like cotton or wool.

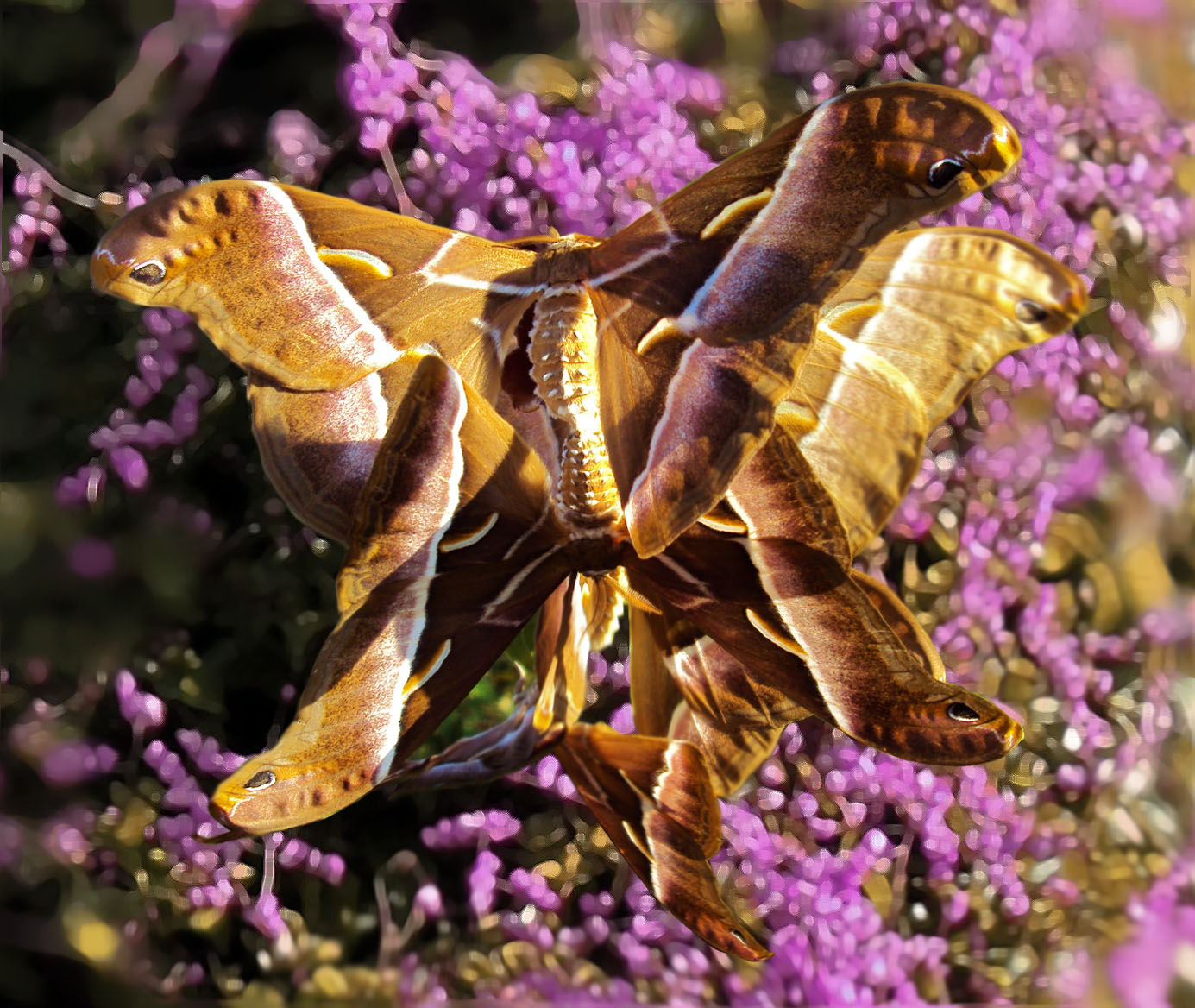
Ailanthus silkmoth from Roxas, Panay island, Philippines

== Range ==
Peigler & Naumann (2003), in their revision of the genus Samia, listed material of true Samia cynthia examined as follows:

=== Indigenous populations ===
- Asia: China (Zhejiang, Shanghai, Jiangxi, Jiangsu, Shandong, Beijing, Shanxi, Liaoning, Heilongjiang); Korea (North Pyongan, South Pyongan, Pyongyang, Kangwon, South Kyongsan, Chungcheongnam-do province)

=== Introduced populations ===
These include moths that have escaped from cultivation or were introduced and naturalized:

- Asia: Japan; India; Philippines; Thailand
- Australasia: Australia
- America: Canada; United States; Venezuela; Uruguay; Brazil
- Africa: Tunisia
- Europe: France; Austria; Switzerland; Germany; Spain; Bulgaria; Italy

== Life cycle ==
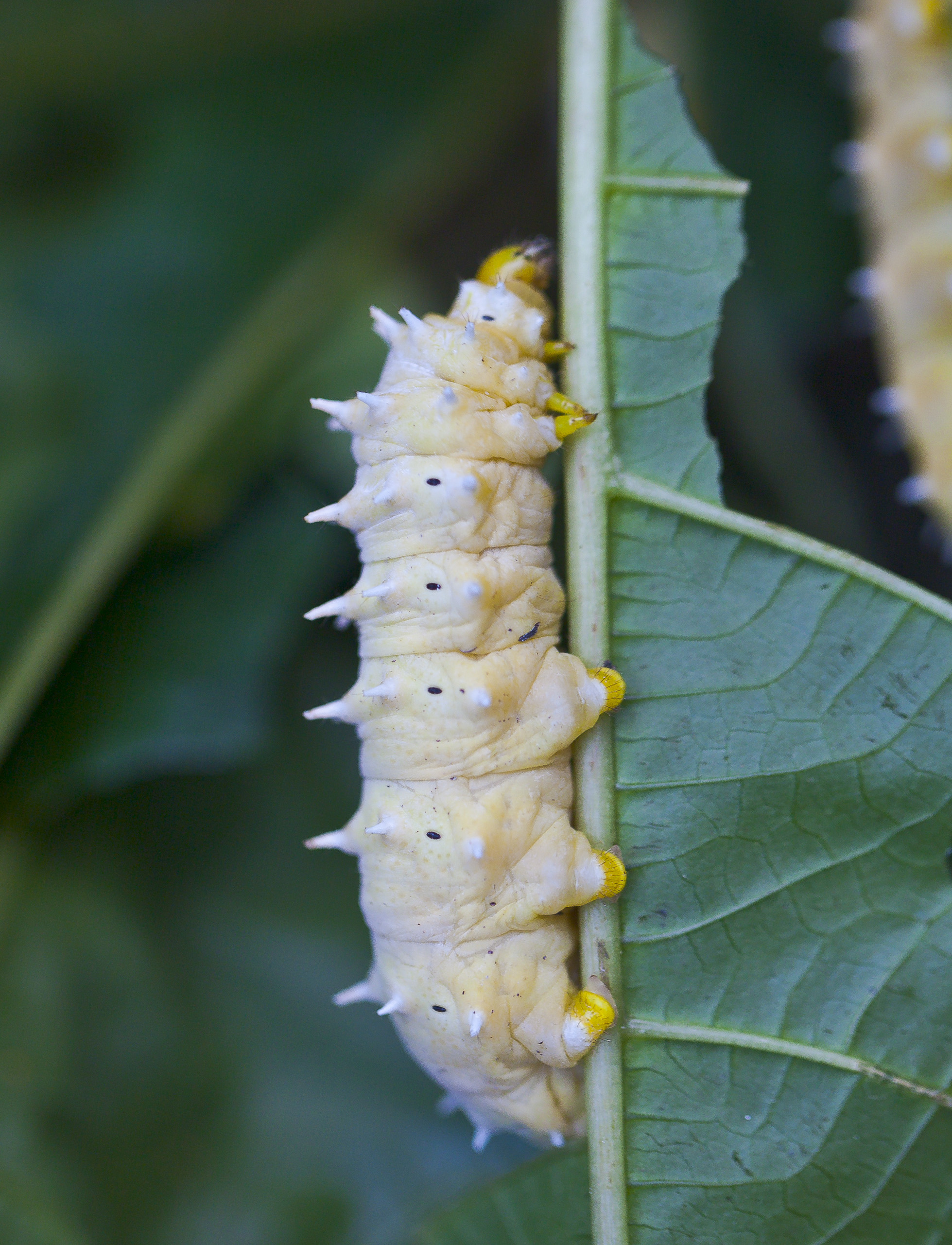
Larvae

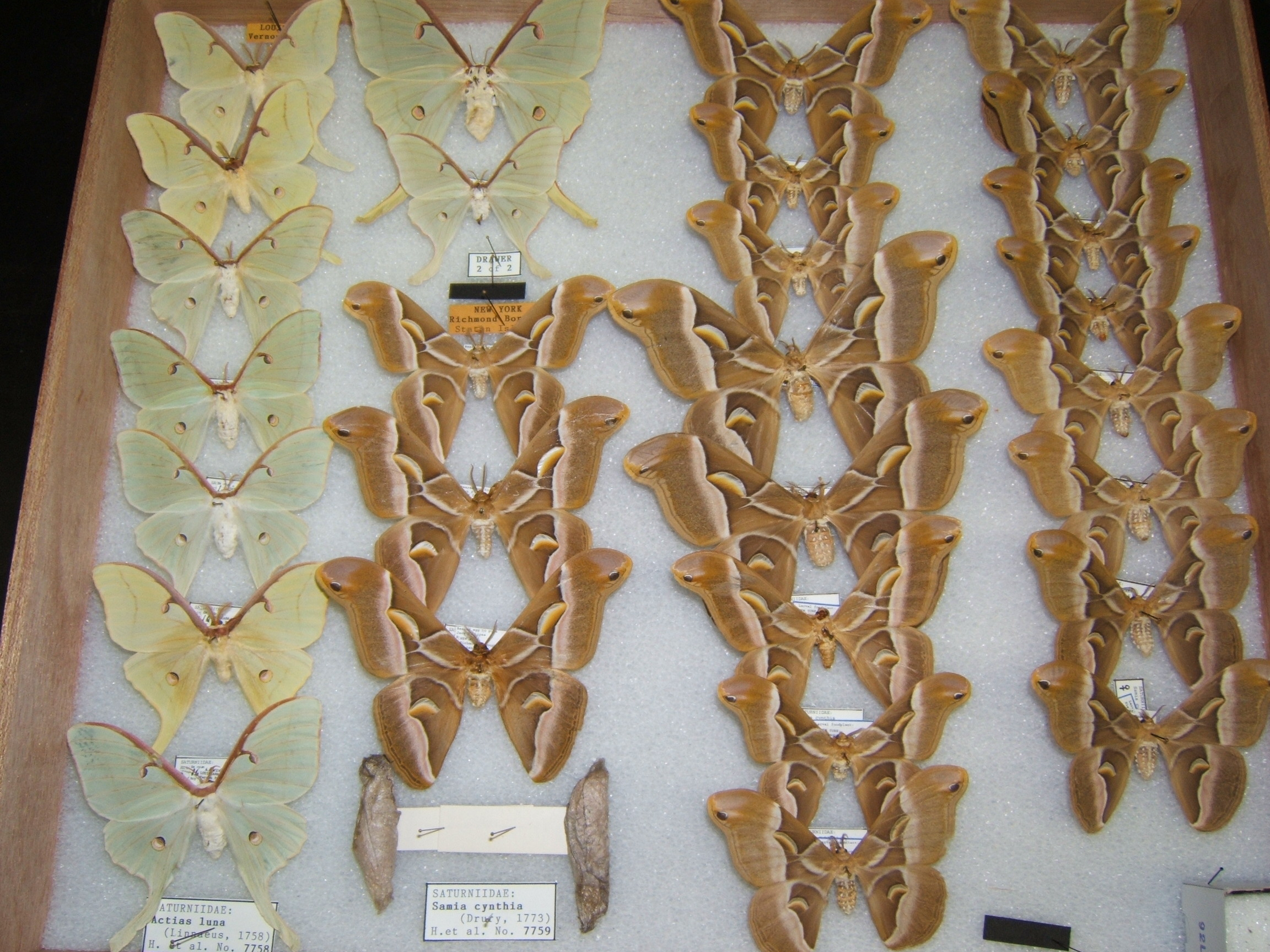
Ailanthus silkmoth diversity (with Actias luna specimens included in first two rows)

=== Eggs ===
Whitish eggs, marked with brown, are laid in rows of 10 to 20 on leaves in crescents. Hatching takes 7 to 10 days.

=== Larvae ===
Larvae are gregarious and yellow at first. Later instars are solitary, and whitish green with white tubercules along the back, and small black dots. There are five instars, and they reach a maximum length 70–75 mm (2.8–3.0 in).

=== Pupae ===
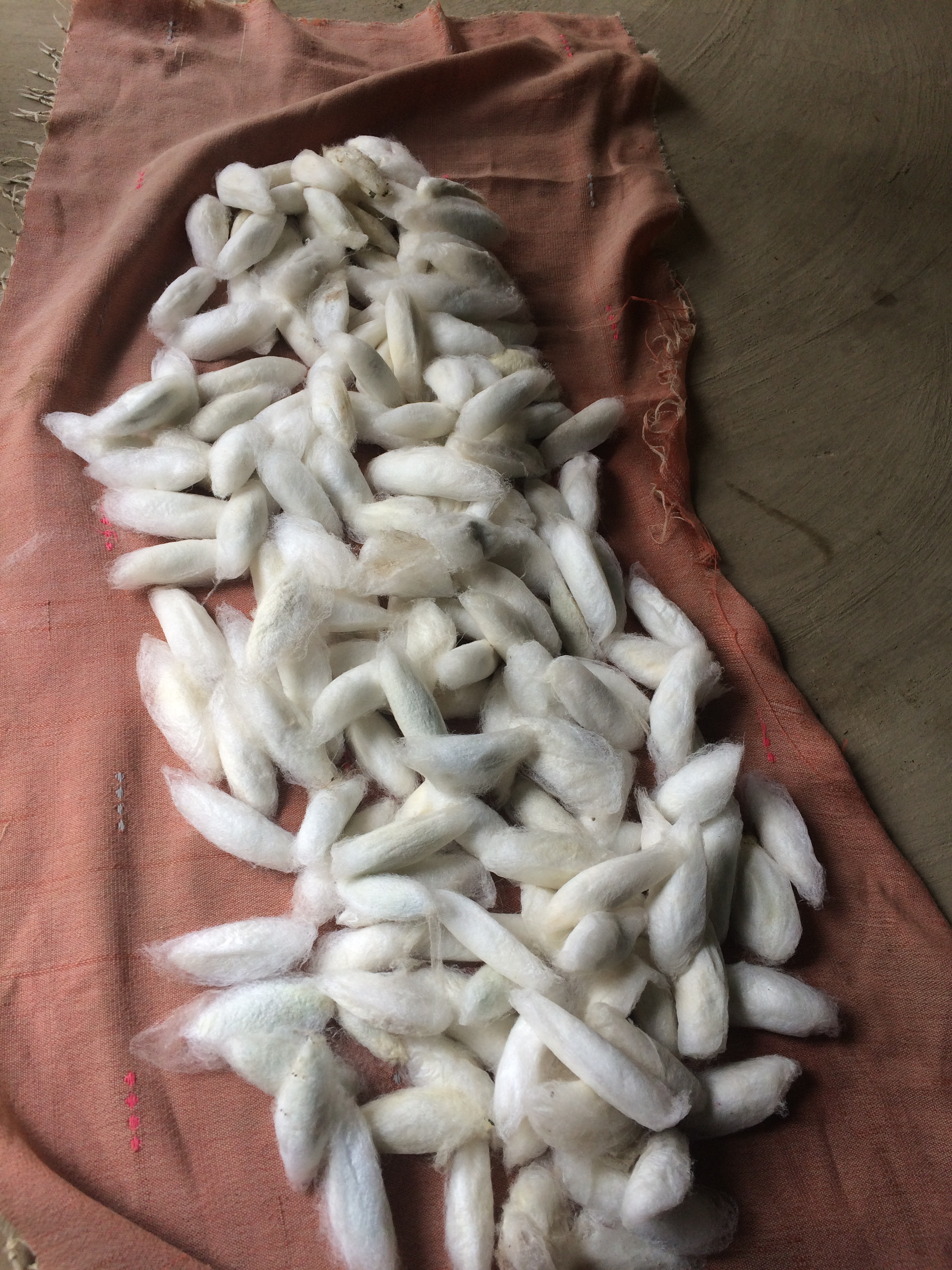
Eri cocoons

A silken off-white to grey cocoon is spun on the leaves of the host. It has an obvious escape hatch.

=== Adults ===
Females prepare to mate in the evening or night after emerging in late morning. Adult flight is during May and June in northern Europe, as one generation. In southern Europe a partial second generation may occur in September. Adults lack mouth parts and can neither eat nor drink.

== Food plants ==
Larvae will feed on other trees and shrubs, but all eggs are laid on the "tree of heaven" (Ailanthus altissima) and growth is best on it. This tree is commonly grown as an ornamental in cities, but is considered a noxious weed and vigorous invasive species and is one of the worst invasive plant species in Europe and North America. The subspecies S. cynthia ricini feeds upon castor bean.

== See also ==
- Sericulture
