= James A. Anderson (academic administrator) =

American academic

Chancellor and Professor of Psychology Fayetteville State University
- In office 2008–2019

Personal details
- Education: Villanova University; Cornell University
- Profession: Academic administrator

James Alan Anderson was the chancellor of Fayetteville State University (beginning 2008), where he was also a professor of psychology.

== Biography ==
Anderson was raised in Washington, D.C. He received an undergraduate degree in psychology from Villanova University in 1970 and earned a doctoral degree in psychology from Cornell University in 1980.

== Career ==
- Chairman of the Department of Psychology 1976–1983, Xavier University of Louisiana, New Orleans
- Professor of Psychology 1983–1992 Indiana University of Pennsylvania
- Vice Provost for Undergraduate Affairs 1992–2003, North Carolina State University
- Vice President and Associate Provost for Institutional Assessment and Diversity 2003–2005, Texas A&M University
- Vice President for Student Success and Vice Provost for Institutional Assessment and Diversity 2005–2008, University at Albany, SUNY
- Chancellor and Professor of Psychology 2008–2019, Fayetteville State University

== Books ==
- The Unfinished Agenda: Brown v. Board of Education (2004)
- Driving Change through Diversity and Globalization-Transformative Leadership in the Academy (2007)
