= James Anderson (botanist) =

Scottish physician and botanist (1738–1809)

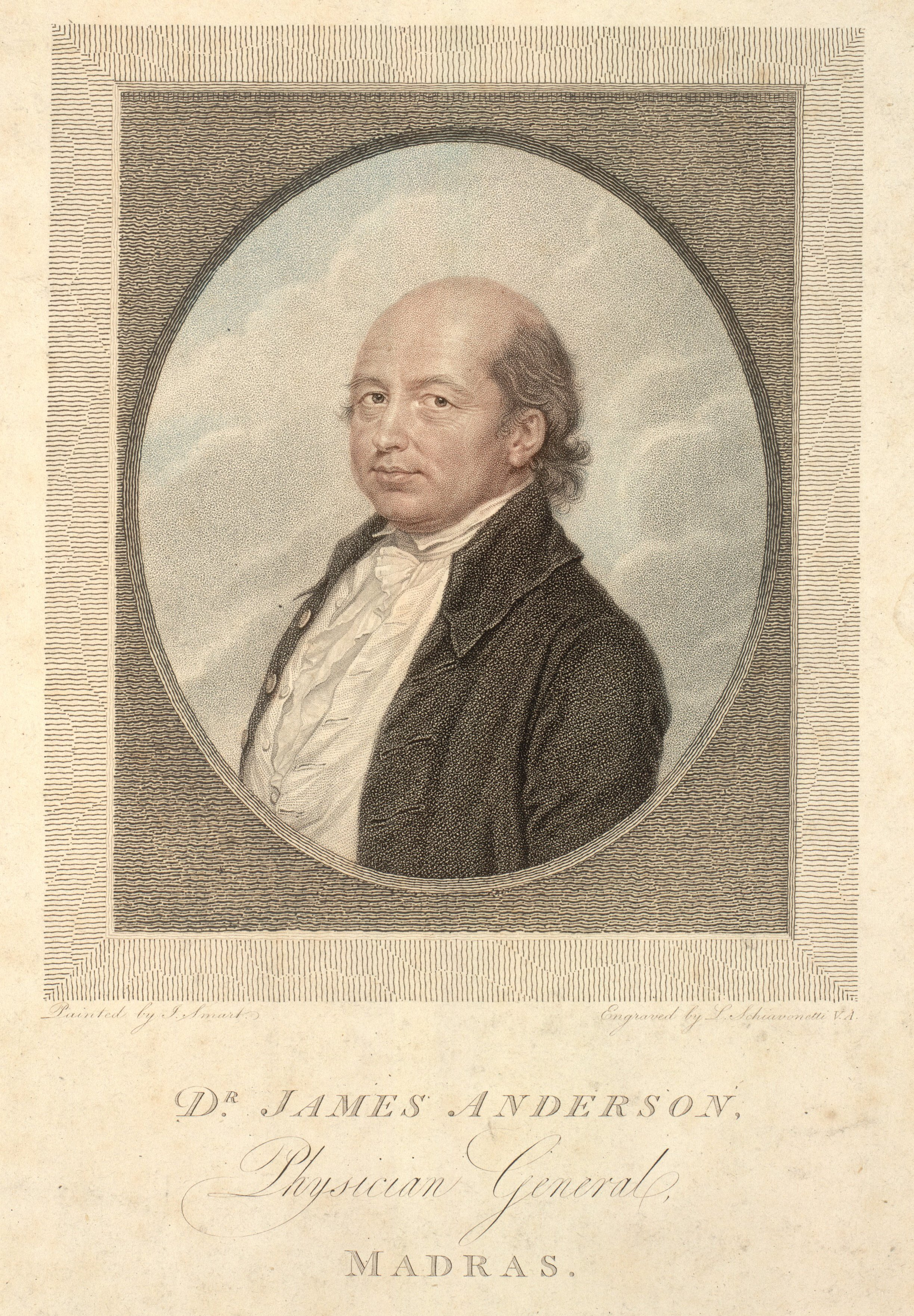
- Engraving by Luigi Schiavonetti, c. 1795, based on a miniature by John Smart
- Born: 17 January 1738; Long Hermiston, Midlothian, Scotland
- Died: 9 August 1809 (aged 71); Madras, India
- Education: University of Edinburgh
- Occupations: Surgeon; physician; botanist
- Spouse: Maria Rheta de la Mabonay (m. 1766)
- Children: 1

James Anderson (17 January 1738 – 6 August 1809) was a Scottish physician and botanist who worked in India as an employee of the East India Company. During his career in India, he was involved in establishing a botanical garden at Mambalam, Madras, originating from a nopalry or Opuntia garden where he made attempts to introduce the cultivation of cochineal insects. He then attempted to introduce various other economically valuable plants, and examined silk and lac production. He maintained a steady communication with his friend from youth, James Anderson LLD (1739–1808) who published some of his notes in The Bee, or Literary Weekly Intelligencer, which has led to the use of the distinguishing form James Anderson MD or James Anderson of Madras.

== Life ==
Anderson was born on 17 January 1738 in Long Hermiston, west of Edinburgh, the son of surgeon Andrew Anderson and Magdalen Sandilands, daughter of Walter 6th Lord Torphichen. He was educated at Ratho school, where his friend James Anderson (1739-1808) who founded the journal, The Bee, also went to, before studying medicine at the University of Edinburgh where his teachers included Professor William Cullen.

Anderson became an East India Company naval surgeon in 1759, and was present during the Siege of Manila in 1763. He settled in the Madras Presidency in 1765 living mainly in Vellore until 1771 and became Surgeon at Madras in 1772 following the death of Samuel Scott. In 1780 he became Surgeon Major (with a salary of 100 pagodas a month), surgeon-general of Madras in 1781, and served as the president of the Madras Medical Board founded in 1786, and ultimately held the position of physician-general with a pay of £2500 a year.

Interested in medicinal plants and horticulture, he set up a botanical garden at Mambalam (or Marmalong) where Anderson introduced mulberry trees, bastard cedar (Guazuma ulmifolia), and experimented with making silk and lac. He introduced apple trees also, and sought to produce local cochineal for which he established an Opuntia garden or nopalry. He wrote on the cultivation of sugarcane, coffee and cotton (in 1790 he was involved in introducing Bourbon cotton in Salem, Thirunelveli and Coimbatore), with several notes published in The Bee edited by James Anderson, LLD, his childhood friend with whom he kept a lifelong correspondence. They wrote biographical notes on each other. Their names have led to confounding of some of their writings.

In his medical practice, he also examined local therapeutics and examined plants of medical importance. He found the native remedy of smoking the roots of "Datura ferox" effective in treating asthma. He however did not recommend some native remedies such as arsenic containing pills for use in snakebite. He examined the eye worm of horses and described a case of epigastric heteropagus conjoint twins which was illustrated by Thomas Reichel. While heading the Madras Medical Board, he recommended Lord Clive to abolish the system of plague-related quarantine at Ennore for ships bound to Madras. He promoted the use of vaccinations in the prevention of smallpox and for which he may have participated in a scheme to dupe Indians to believe that vaccination was an ancient Indian practice and therefore more acceptable. Scholar F.W. Ellis is thought to have created a Sanskrit verse that purportedly described the vaccine and a fake notice under an Indian pseudonym Calvi Virumbom was inserted into the Madras Courier, a local newspaper and the "discovery" was then propagated widely.

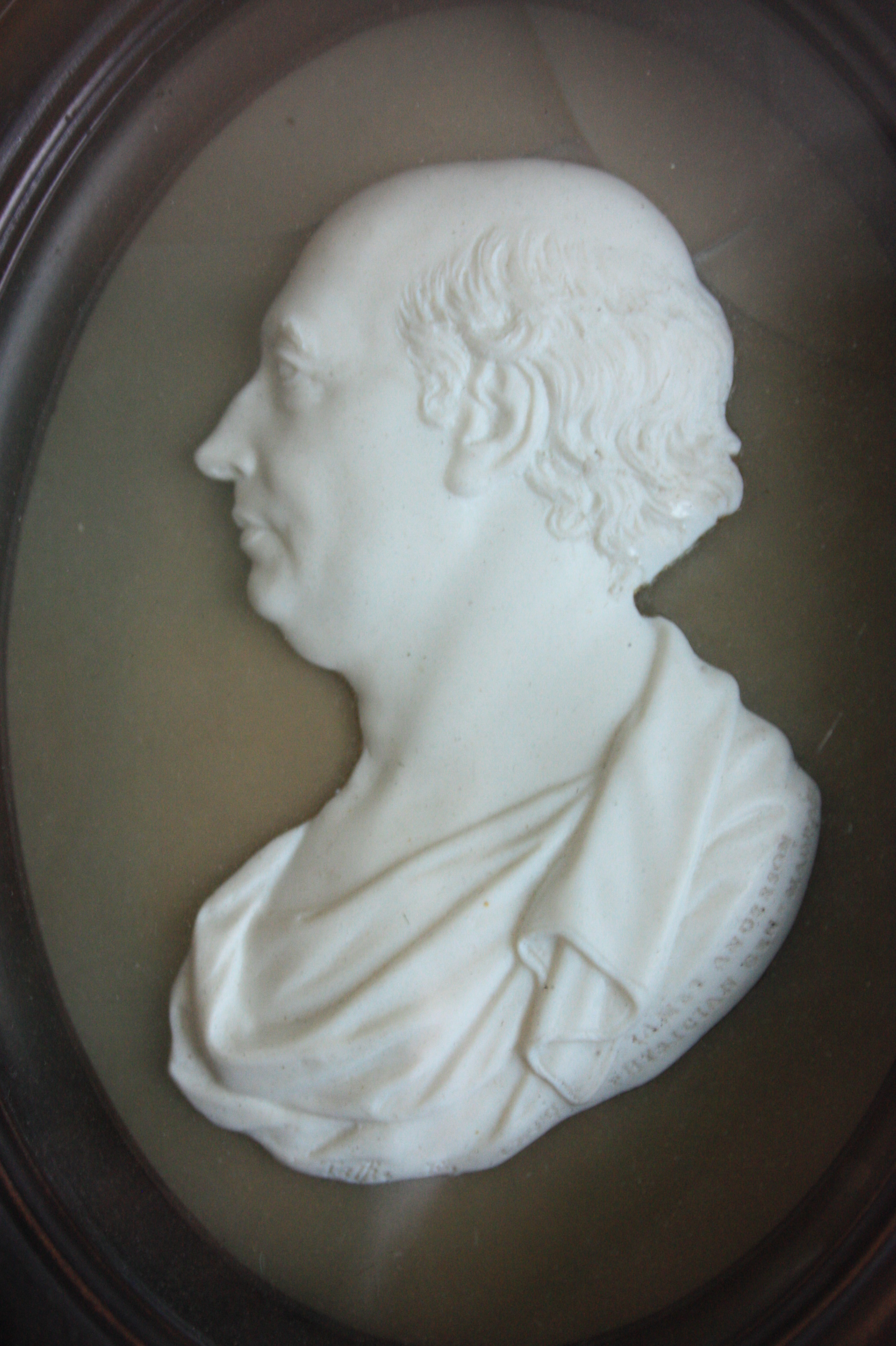
Plaster medallion by James Tassie, c. 1793

He died at his garden home in Madras which was later occupied by Sir Thomas Pycroft became Pycroft Gardens. He married Maria Rheta de la Mabonay in 1766 and they had a daughter Ann Anderson who married merchant Charles Wallace Young (d. 1801 at Palamcottah), a cousin of Dr Andrew Berry (Berry was Anderson's nephew, son of his sister Janet who was married to William Berry). Ann died in 1810 and her memorial was erected by Berry. Anderson's bridge (over the Cooum, now called College Bridge between Moore's and Pantheon roads) and Anderson road (which remains in use, connecting Haddows and Greams Roads) were named after him and a monument to him by Chantrey is installed at St George's Cathedral in Madras. His memorial in the compound of St. Mary's Church had a bust and a magnifying glass which are lost.

=== Cochineal ===
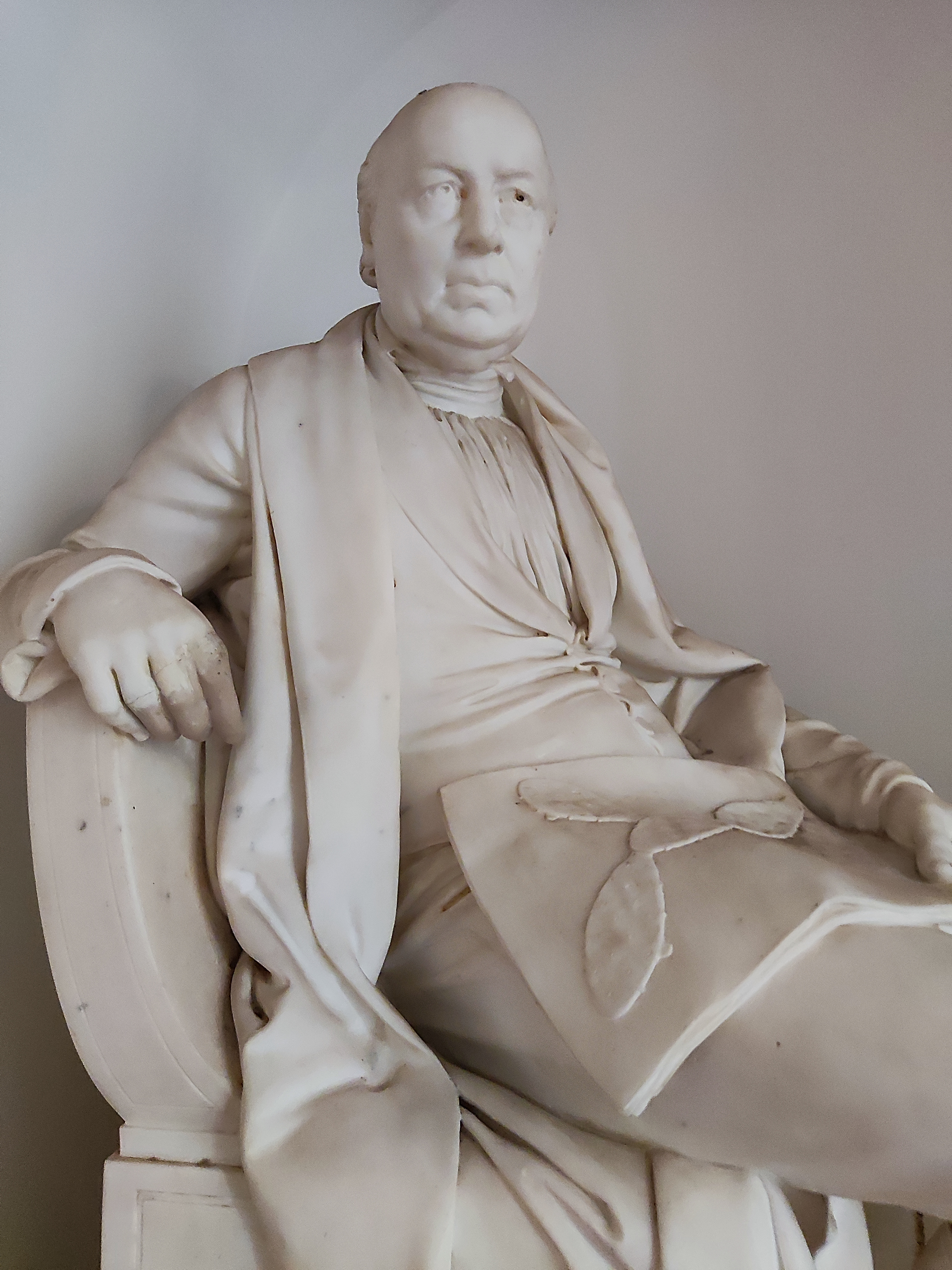
Memorial by Chantrey at St. George's Cathedral, Madras, showing a herbarium sheet on Anderson's lap with Opuntia bearing cochineal insects.

Trade in cochineal was predominantly controlled by the Spanish starting from 1523 to around 1730. With the prices growing, and the growing demand for red coats with the English army uniform regulations introduced in 1645 had even led to piracy of Spanish ships sailing from Mexico to Europe. In 1786 James Anderson wrote to Joseph Banks about scale insects found in Madras that appeared to be similar to cochineal that he identified as Kermes. The generic name of this insect was proposed as Chloeoon by Anderson in 1788 with the type species being Chloeoon choromandelensis. Anderson sent samples to Banks and in the meantime he learned from other correspondents that true cochineal grew only on Opuntia. At that time cochineal imports into Britain were about 200000 pounds per annum and the court of the East India Company was immediately interested. Banks identified the insects sent by Anderson as Coccus and it was declared by the dyers' guild to be useless. However Banks decided that the Spanish cochineal should be able to grow in Madras given the similar latitudes and he asked Anderson to organize a nopalry (Opuntia garden, Opuntia was earlier called Nopalea cochenillifera from which the term Nopalery or Nopalry is derived) in Mambalam ("Marmalon") with a grant of 2000 pounds from the Committee of Secrecy of the East India Company. Opuntia specimens with cochineal were then collected from Brazil in 1789 and shipped to India and they reached India. They were grown in Samalkotta by William Roxburgh. It was considered as a suitable food for famine relief but the people in the region refused it. Anderson however was able to get poor people in Madras to incorporate it into their food. Anderson then sent Opuntia across southern India supposedly for famine relief. Attempts to transport cochineal insects failed until a Captain R. Neilson collected some specimens at Rio de Janeiro and reached Diamond Harbour aboard the Contractor on 15 September 1794. Anderson also learned of Opuntia growing in the vicinity of Mylapore locally called naga kalli which had been brought in by the Portuguese in the sixteenth century. Although a scale insect that yielded cochineal was established, it was found to be inferior to Mexican sylvestre cochineal. In 1797 about 4000 pounds of cochineal was produced a year in India and it increased in 1798 and rewards were offered for establishing "true" cochineal in India. True cochineal Dactylopius coccus was not introduced to India during Anderson's lifetime, the species introduced from Brazil was likely Dactylopius ceylonicus which has a greater production of wax filaments. Anderson's nopalry was heavily damaged in the cyclone of 1807 and overgrown in 1808 when the last surviving Opuntia was noted by Maria Graham. After his death, the garden was maintained by Dr. Andrew Berry.

== Taxonomy references ==
William Roxburgh (1751–1815) named the genus Andersonia after him in 1832. The name is an illegitimate homonym as the name was already in use for a member of the Ericaceae described by Robert Brown in 1810. The binomial of the eri silk moth Samia ricini has sometimes been attributed to Anderson but research now suggests that the correct author attribution would be to Jones (more accurately, Jones in Anderson, 1791) who gave the name Phalaena ricini in a letter to Anderson in 1791.

== Other sources ==
- Ray Desmond (1994). Dictionary of British and Irish Botanists and Horticulturists including Plant Collectors, Flower Painters and Garden Designers. Taylor & Francis and The Natural History Museum (London). ISBN 0-85066-843-3
