= Fei Xu =

American Professor of Psychology

- 徐绯
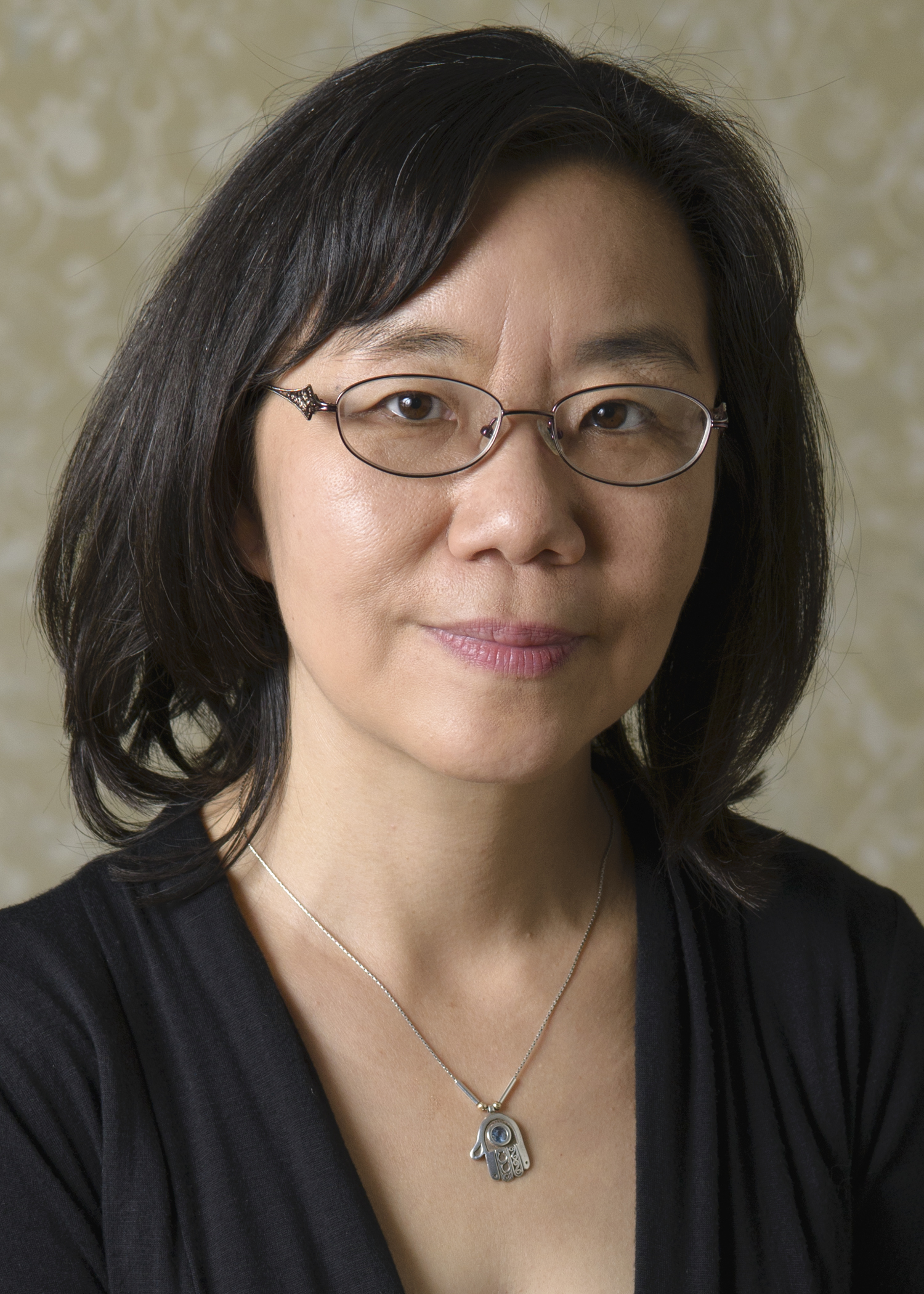
- Born: 1969 (age 56–57); Beijing, China
- Occupation: Professor of Psychology
- Years active: 1995–present

Academic background
- Education: Ph.D. in Cognitive Science
- Alma mater: Smith College (B.A. 1991); M.I.T. (Ph.D. 1995)
- Thesis: Criteria of Object Individual and Numerical Identity in Infants and Adults: The Object-first Hypothesis (1995)
- Doctoral advisor: Susan Carey

Academic work
- Discipline: Psychologist
- Sub-discipline: Developmental psychology; Cognitive science; Bayesian cognitive science
- Institutions: Northeastern University (1997–2003); University of British Columbia (2003–2009); UC Berkeley (2009–present)

Fei Xu (Chinese: 徐绯; pinyin: Xú Fēi; born 1969) is an American developmental psychologist and cognitive scientist who is currently a professor of psychology and the director of the Berkeley Early Learning Lab at UC Berkeley. Her research focuses on cognitive and language development, from infancy to middle childhood.

== Early life ==
Xu was born and raised in Beijing, China, where she graduated from the High School Affiliated to Renmin University of China. She moved to the U.S. and attended Smith College, graduating in 1991 with a B.A. in Cognitive Science. She earned her Ph.D. in Cognitive Science from M.I.T. in 1995.

== Career ==
Xu began her career as a postdoctoral fellow at the University of Pennsylvania, Rutgers University, and M.I.T. under Alan M. Leslie. She joined Northeastern University as an assistant professor in 1997. In 2003, she moved to Vancouver to be an associate professor at the University of British Columbia (UBC) and was awarded the Canada Research Chair in Developmental Cognitive Science. She was a visiting professor at UC Berkeley in 2007–2008, then returned to UBC. In 2009, she joined the UC Berkeley Department of Psychology as a Professor, where she is also the director of the school's Early Learning Lab.

== Research ==
Xu worked with several prominent developmental and cognitive psychologists early in her career. She worked with Susan Carey for her Ph.D. research on object individuation, sortal concepts, and early word learning. She worked with Elizabeth Spelke as a postdoctoral fellow, focusing on prelinguistic infants' representation of numbers. She also worked with Alan Leslie at Rutgers University on infants' object concept.

Inspired by a philosophical analysis of sortals/kind concepts, Xu developed a new method for studying how infants track objects over time and how they establish representations of multiple objects in an event (i.e., object individuation). She found that it is not until about 12 months of age that infants are able to use the differences between, for example, a toy duck and a ball to decide that there are two objects in an event, perhaps because infants did not represent the objects as belonging to two different kinds (i.e., duck and ball). Furthermore, learning words for object kinds may play a critical role in object individuation and the developmental of kind concepts.

In another line of work, Xu investigated whether prelinguistic infants can estimate numbers. She found that 6-month-old infants can discriminate between an array of 8 dots and 16 dots, but not between an array of 8 dots and 12 dots. That is, infants have a number sense, like many other non-human animals. The number sense is a number estimation system that is evolutionarily old and is distinct from our verbal counting system.

Xu's lab has also published research on early inductive learning mechanisms. They found that 6-, 8-, and 11-month-old infants have a rudimentary understanding of probability, and they can use this understanding to make inferences about the physical and psychological world. When an infant is shown an experimenter (with her eyes closed) randomly picking 4 red and 1 white ping-pong balls from a box, infants infer that the box must contain a majority of red ping-pong balls and a minority of white ping-pong balls.

Taking an interdisciplinary, cognitive science approach to the study of learning and development, Xu and her collaborators have developed computational models – Bayesian probabilistic models – on word learning, object perception, preference attribution, question-asking, infants' surprise, and hypothesis generation.

Beginning in the 2010s, Xu advocated for a new approach to the study of cognitive development, namely rational constructivism. She argued that human infants begin life with a set of proto-conceptual primitives such as object, number, and agent, and as young learners acquire language, these initial representations are transformed into a format that is compatible with language and propositional thought. She suggested that three types of learning mechanisms explain both belief revision and genuine conceptual change: (1) Language and symbol learning; (2) Bayesian inductive learning; and (3) Constructive thinking. She also suggests that infants and young children are active learners, and cognitive agency is part and parcel of development. In addition, she has explored the implications of rational constructivism for philosophy of mind and epistemology.

== Awards ==
- 2006: Stanton Prize from the Society for Philosophy and Psychology.
- 2018: Guggenheim Fellowship
- She is a fellow of the Association for Psychological Science and is a member of the editorial board for Psychological Science.
- 2020: Fellow of the Society of Experimental Psychologists.
- 2023: Fellow, American Psychological Association (APA Division 7)
- 2024–2025: Miller Professor, Miller Institute for Basic Research in Science, University of California, Berkeley
- 2024: Fellow, American Association for the Advancement of Science
- 2025: Mary Ainsworth Award for Excellence in Developmental Science, American Psychological Association

== Selected bibliography ==
- Xu, F. (1995) Criteria of Object Individual and Numerical Identity in Infants and Adults: The Object-first Hypothesis. M.I.T.
- Leslie, A., Xu, F., Tremoulet, P, & Scholl, B. (1998)"Indexing and the object concept: developing 'what' and 'where' systems". Trends in Cognitive Sciences.
- Xu, F. & Spelke, S. (2000) "Large number discrimination in 6-month-old infants". Cognition.
- Xu, F., & Tenenbaum, J. B. (2007). Word learning as Bayesian inference. Psychological Review, 114(2), 245–272.
- Xu, F. & Garcia, V. (2008). Intuitive statistics by 8-month-old infants. Proceedings of the National Academy of Sciences 105 (13), 5012-5015
- Xu, F. & Kushnir, T., eds. (2012) Rational Constructivism in Cognitive Development. Advances in Child Development and Behavior, Vol. 43. Academic Press.
- Xu, F. & Kushnir, T. (2013) "Infants are rational constructive learners". Current Directions in Psychological Science.
- Xu. F. (2016) "Preliminary thoughts on a rational constructivist approach to cognitive development: primitives, symbols, learning, and thinking". In Core knowledge and concept change. Oxford University Press.
- Fedyk, M. & Xu, F. (2018) "The epistemology of rational constructivism". Review of Philosophy and Psychology.
- Xu, F. (2019) "Towards a rational constructivist theory of cognitive development". Psychological Review.
- Denison, S. & Xu, F. (2019) "Infant statisticians: the origins of reasoning under uncertainty". Perspectives on Psychological Science.
