= Society for Philosophy and Psychology =

- Logo of the SPP
- Formation: 1974
- President: Lila Gleitman
- Website: www.socphilpsych.org

The Society for Philosophy and Psychology (SPP) is a professional organization in North America that promotes discussion and research at the intersection of philosophy, psychology and cognitive science. Its stated purpose is "to promote interaction between philosophers, psychologists and other cognitive scientists on issues of common concern." To this end, it organizes an annual conference, maintains a listserve, and awards research prizes.

== History ==
The first meeting was held at MIT in 1974 and Jerry Fodor was nominated first president of the society, though it was not until the 1976 meeting that a constitution was adopted and officers were elected. The first joint meeting with its European counterpart, the European Society for Philosophy and Psychology (ESPP) was held in Barcelona in 2004, with subsequent joint meetings in 2011 (Montreal) and 2022 (Milan).

== Stanton Prize ==
The SPP annually awards the Stanton Prize to a young active member of the society who has made a significant contribution to interdisciplinary research. Recipients of the award include:

- 2001, Kathleen Akins, Simon Frasier University
- 2002, Paul Bloom, Yale University
- 2003, Jesse Prinz, University of North Carolina at Chapel Hill
- 2004, David Chalmers, Australian National University
- 2005, Shaun Nichols, University of Arizona
- 2006, Fei Xu, University of British Columbia
- 2007, John Doris, Washington University in St. Louis
- 2008, Laurie Santos, Yale University
- 2009, Joshua Knobe, Yale University
- 2010, Tania Lombrozo, University of California, Berkeley
- 2011, Adina Roskies, Dartmouth College
- 2012, Joshua Greene, Harvard University
- 2013, Edouard Machery, University of Pittsburgh
- 2014, Fiery Cushman, Brown University
- 2015, Sarah-Jane Leslie, Princeton University
- 2016, Liane Young, Boston College
- 2017, Felipe De Brigard, Duke University
- 2018, Kiley Hamlin, University of British Columbia
- 2019, Chandra Sripada, University of Michigan
- 2020, Marjorie Rhodes, New York University
- 2021, Jonathan Phillips, Dartmouth College
- 2022, Chaz Firestone, Johns Hopkins University
- 2023, Eric Mandelbaum, CUNY Graduate Center
- 2024, Tobias Gerstenberg, Stanford University
- 2025, Shannon Spaulding, Oklahoma State University
