= Giving Multiplier =

Donation platform

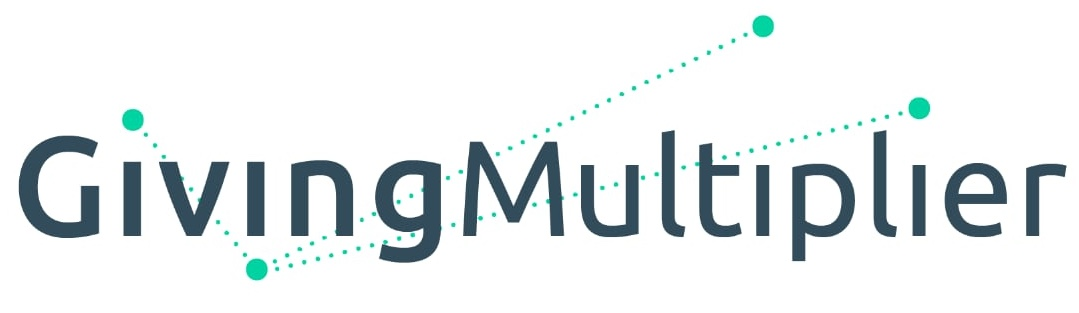
- Founded: November 2020
- Founders: Lucius Caviola, PhD & Joshua Greene, PhD
- Founded at: Harvard University
- Purpose: Promoting effective giving
- Members: 5,600 (2026)
- Website: givingmultiplier.org

Giving Multiplier is a donation platform promoting effective giving. It was founded at Harvard University in 2020 by psychologists Joshua Greene and Lucius Caviola.

== History ==
Giving Multiplier was created as a research project in 2020 by Joshua Greene, a psychology professor at Harvard and Lucius Caviola, professor at University of Cambridge, who was a postdoctoral researcher at Harvard at the time. The goal of creating Giving Multiplier was to introduce people to effective charities in a way that overcomes some of the psychological barriers to effective giving. As of June 2026, Giving Multiplier has facilitated over 12,000 donations totaling more than $6.4 million from more than 5,600 donors.

== Research ==
Giving Multiplier uses research from charity evaluators such as GiveWell, Animal Charity Evaluators, and Founders Pledge, to select a list of ten "super-effective" charities addressing three cause areas: extreme poverty, animal welfare, and global catastrophic risks.

Giving Multiplier lets donors select their favorite charity and one of their super-effective charities (i.e., "with the heart and the head") to implement a donation bundling technique. This innovation combines donors' seemingly conflicting preferences, namely, that they have their own favorite charities, and they simultaneously care about effectiveness. Moreover, Giving Multiplier uses donation matching to further incentivize donors to donate more effectively. The original design by Caviola and Greene integrated donation bundling with a new technique called micro-matching. Micro-matching works by adding matching funds on top of each donation, with a greater matching rate for a greater proportion allocated to the super-effective charity. Individual donors support the matching system to encourage others to donate, creating a "supply and demand" cycle of charitable giving.

The proof of concept for Giving Multiplier was published as part of Greene and Caviola's academic research on splitting donations between favorite charities and effective charities. Their research found that including an option to split donations between a favorite charity and effective charity increased effective giving by 76%. The authors suggested that favorite-effective donation splits satisfies donors' dual motivations of supporting causes meaningful to them and effective organizations that have a big impact.

== Current list of super-effective charities ==
As of April 2025, Giving Multiplier's list of super-effective charities (based on charity evaluators' recommendations) include:

- Against Malaria Foundation
- Clean Air Task Force
- Evidence Action (Deworm the World Initiative)
- GiveDirectly
- Good Food Institute
- Helen Keller International (Vitamin A supplementation program)
- Johns Hopkins Center for Health Security
- Malaria Consortium (Seasonal malaria chemoprevention program)
- New Incentives
- The Humane League
