= Psychological barriers to effective altruism =

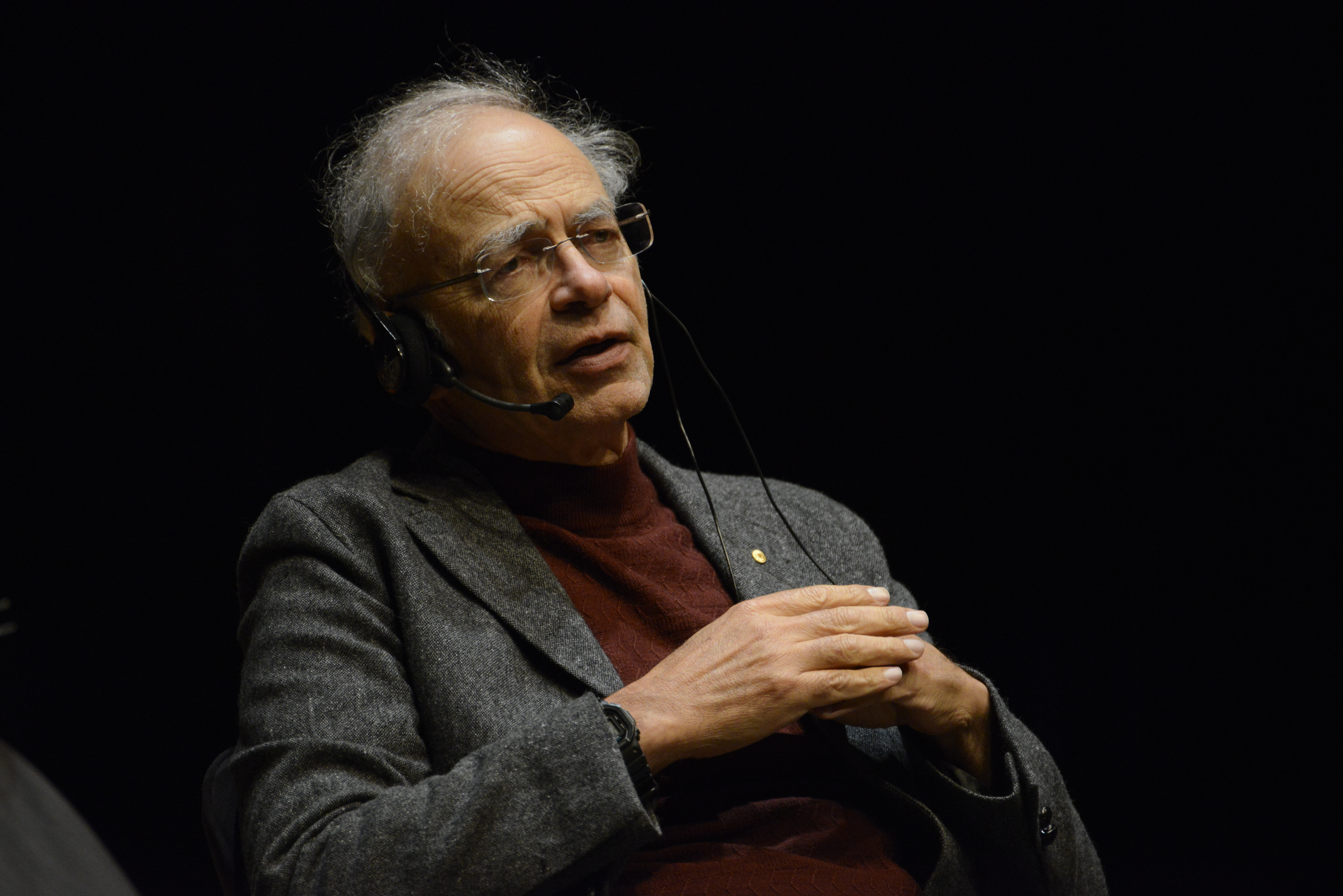
Peter Singer is one of the prominent philosophers of effective altruism.

In the philosophy of effective altruism, an altruistic act such as charitable giving is considered more effective, or cost-effective, if it uses a set of resources to do more good per unit of resource than other options, with the goal of trying to do the most good. In a book written by effective altruism scholars Stefan Schubert and Lucius Caviola, the effectiveness of helping is defined by how many lives you save or how much good you otherwise do with a given amount of resources.

Following this definition of effectiveness, researchers in psychology and related fields have identified psychological barriers to effective altruism that can cause people to choose less effective options when they engage in altruistic activities such as charitable giving. These barriers can include evolutionary influences as well as motivational and epistemic obstacles.

== Overview ==
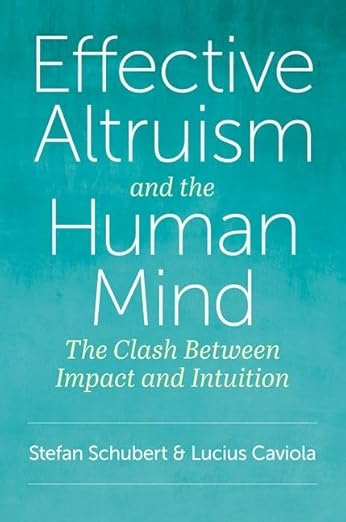
Effective Altruism and the Human Mind: The Clash Between Impact and Intuition by Stefan Schubert and Lucius Caviola.

In general, humans are motivated to do good things in the world, whether that is through donations to charity, volunteering time for a cause, or just lending a hand to someone who needs help. In 2022, approximately 4.2 billion people donated their money, time, or helped a stranger. Donating money to charity is especially substantial. For instance, 2% of the GDP of the United States goes to charitable organizations—a total of more than $450 billion in annual donations. Despite the human tendency and motivation to give and engage in altruistic behavior, research has shed light on an unequal motivation to give effectively.

Humans are motivated to give, but often not motivated to give most effectively. In the title of an article published in Nature Human Behaviour in 2020, Bethany Burum, Martin Nowak, and Moshe Hoffman termed this phenomenon ineffective altruism, that is, relatively less sensitivity to cost-effectiveness in altruistic behaviour. In the domain of business decisions, investors look for how much return they will get for each dollar they invest. However, when it comes to the domain of altruistic decision-making, this line of thinking is far less common. Most donors seem to prioritize giving to charitable organizations that spend the least possible amount on running costs in the hopes of having more of their donation reach the destination.

== Evolutionary explanations ==
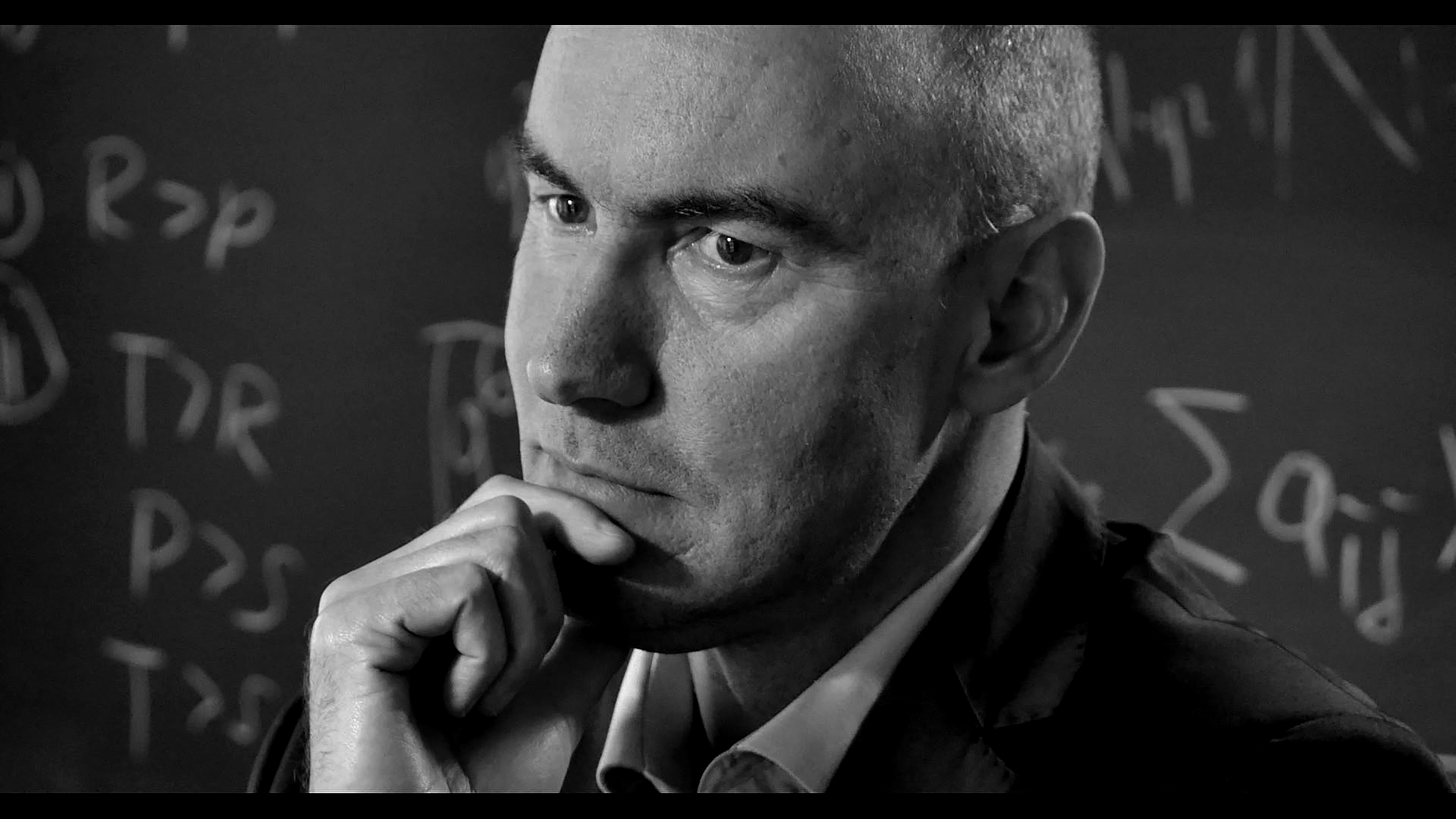
Martin Nowak is a professor at Harvard University whose research contributions include the theory of evolution and cooperation.

While plenty of studies in the behavioral sciences have demonstrated the cognitive and emotional limitations in charitable giving, some argue that the reasons behind ineffective giving run deeper. A study by Martin Nowak and fellow academics at Harvard University and the Massachusetts Institute of Technology suggested that the human tendency to ineffective altruism can be explained through evolutionary motives and evolutionary game theory. They argue that society rewards the act of giving but generally provides no motivation or incentive to give effectively. Past research suggests that altruistic motives are distorted by, among other things, parochialism, status seeking and conformity.

=== Parochialism ===
People are sensitive to effectiveness when they or their kin are at stake, but not so much when confronted with a needy stranger. Donors have been shown to respond to impact and efficacy when giving to themselves, but less so when donating to charity. While cost-effectiveness information of charities tends to be hard to evaluate, studies have shown that people are less scope insensitive when the beneficiaries are family members.

Throughout human evolutionary history, residing in small, tightly knit groups has given rise to prosocial emotions and intentions towards kin and ingroup members, rather than universally extending to those outside the group boundaries. Humans tend to exhibit parochial tendencies, showing concern for their in-groups, but not out-groups. This parochial inclination can hinder effective altruism, especially as a significant portion of human suffering occurs in distant regions. Despite the potential impact of donations in different parts of the world, individuals in rich and developed countries often view assistance to physically distant others as less important than helping those in close proximity. Contrary to maximizing impact and effectiveness with their donations, many individuals commit to donating money to local charities and organizations to which they have a personal connection, thus living by the notion of "charity begins at home." Similarly, people are more inclined to help a needy child from their neighborhood rather than their city or country.

=== Status seeking ===
Humans assign value to their social status within a group for survival and reproduction. People tend to pursue high-status positions to enjoy benefits, such as desirable mating partners. Therefore, behaviors that can produce reputational benefits are desirable to enhance one's standing in society. Altruistic acts are generally viewed positively, yield social rewards, and are cumulative. However, effective altruism, that is, altruistic behavior that focuses on maximizing others' welfare, is often not socially rewarded. Evidence-based reasoning in charitable giving may be perceived negatively, as amoral, and so will reduce a person's likability. Some have even argued that the reputational costs incurred for engaging in effective giving explain people's aversion to prioritizing some causes over more impactful ones.

=== Conformity ===
Many living organisms have demonstrated conformity, that is, the tendency to use dominant group norms (or descriptive norms) as guiding rules of behavior. Research on humans has also shown that social norms have the power to influence what others do. In the judgment and decision-making research, this observation has come to be known as the bandwagon effect. The power of this bias has also been demonstrated in the field of charitable giving. In fact, people have been shown to donate more, or to exhibit an increased likelihood to donate, when they perceived donating to charity as the social norm or the default choice. Therefore, the fact that many people become increasingly in favor of donating to ineffective options, then society will see the creation of a norm for people to give ineffectively. As a result, people rely more strongly on their intuitions which lead them to choosing to give ineffectively simply because they know that most others would do the same thing.

== Motivational obstacles ==
=== Subjective preferences ===
People often prioritize giving to charities that align with their subjectively preferred causes. Commonly, people believe charity to be a subjective decision which should not be motivated by numbers, but by care for the cause given the lack of responsibility attributed to the effects of donations. This aligns with the theory of warm-glow giving originally proposed by the economist James Andreoni. According to Andreoni (1990), individuals gain satisfaction from the act of giving but are not concerned about the benefits generated by their act.

=== Narrow moral circle ===
Moral circle expansion is the concept of increasing one's number and kind of subjects deserving of moral concern over time. The establishment of one's moral circle depends on spatial, biological, and temporal proximity. For instance, many donors in WEIRD countries tend to favor charities that conduct work within their respective geographical boundaries. In terms of biological distance, people favor donating money to help humans instead of animals, even in cases when animals can have equal cognitive and suffering capacities. The idea of temporal proximity relates to people's tendency to prefer helping current generations over future ones.

=== Scope neglect (insensitivity) ===
Scope neglect (or scope insensitivity) is the idea that people are numb to the number of victims in large, high-stake humanitarian situations. Some research has compared this cognitive bias to the economic concept of diminishing marginal utility wherein people demonstrate a decreasing non-linear concern for individuals as the number of people increases.

== Epistemic obstacles ==
=== Overhead aversion ===
Donors are averse to giving to charities that devote a lot of their expenses to administration or running costs. Several studies have demonstrated the ubiquitous effect of overhead aversion which is commonly attributed to people's conflation between overhead spending and charity cost-effectiveness (or impact). Furthermore, some have argued that when donors learn that a charity uses their donation to fund running costs, donors experience a diminished feeling of warm-glow, which is a significant driver of donation behavior.

=== Quantifiability scepticism ===
Demonstration of quality-adjusted life years (QALYs) for two individuals. Individual A (who did not receive an intervention) has fewer QALYs than individual B (who received an intervention).

Intangible outcomes (such as health interventions, charity effectiveness) are hard to quantify, and many people doubt that they can ever be quantified and compared. However, in disciplines such as health economics, health outcomes and interventions are quantified and evaluated using metrics such as quality-adjusted life years (QALYs). In a similar vein, happiness economists have developed the concept of wellbeing-years (WELLBYs) which evaluates effectiveness in terms of life-years lived up to full life satisfaction. Put simply, a WELLBY is given by:
$$WELLBY = { L \times\Delta W }$$
Where $L$ is the number of lives remaining from the region's life expectancy and $\Delta W$ is the change in life satisfaction expected to result from a particular action or intervention. Thus, charity cost-effectiveness analyses use a number of different measures grounded in academic research to quantify their impact, allowing direct comparisons of charities that address multiple causes.

=== Limited awareness ===
The effective altruism movement does substantial work on identifying the world's most effective charities through charity evaluators such as GiveWell, Giving What We Can, and Animal Charity Evaluators. However, many people are unaware of these organizations and the charities they evaluate, and are strongly driven by emotional responses when estimating the effectiveness of a charity; choosing instead to prioritize those causes to which they have a personal connection.

== See also ==
- Altruism (ethics)
- Charitable organization
- Evidence-based policy
- List of cognitive biases
- Moral psychology
- Social preferences
- Social psychology
