= Joshua Greene (psychologist) =

American experimental psychologist, neuroscientist, and moral philosopher

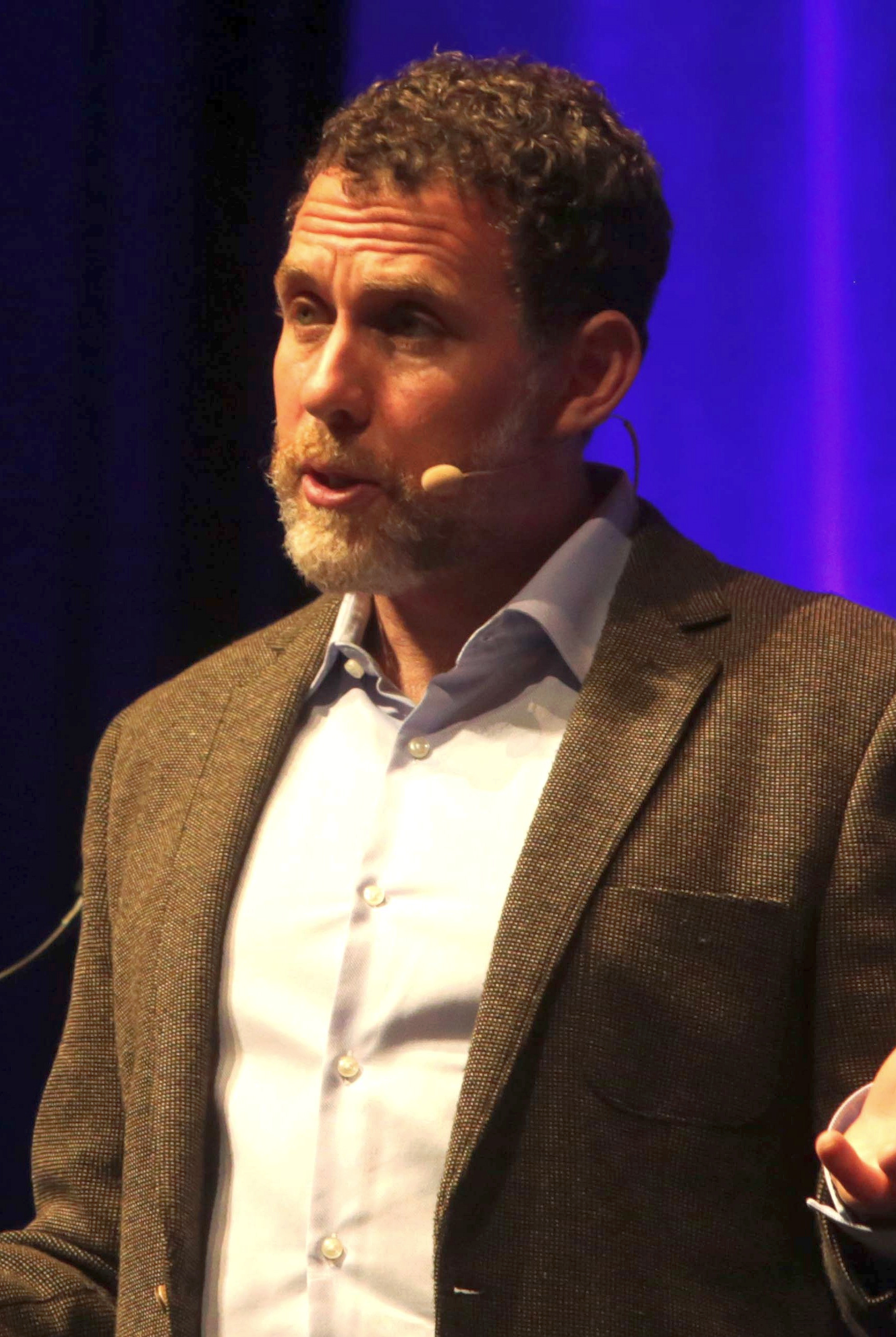
- Joshua Greene in 2018
- Born: 1974 (age 51–52)
- Education: Harvard University (BA); Princeton University (PhD)
- Known for: Dual process theory
- Scientific career
- Fields: Experimental psychology, moral psychology, neuroscience, social psychology, philosophy
- Workplaces: Harvard University
- Thesis: The Terrible, Horrible, No Good, Very Bad Truth About Morality and What to Do About It (2002)
- Doctoral advisor: David Lewis; Gilbert Harman
- Website: www.joshua-greene.net

Joshua David Greene (born 1974) is an American experimental psychologist, neuroscientist, and philosopher. He is the inaugural Alfred and Rebecca Lin Professor of Civil Discourse and Professor of Psychology at Harvard University, where he is also a member of the Center for Brain Science faculty. Much of his research has examined moral judgment and decision-making, with a focus on the interplay between emotion and reason in moral dilemmas such as trolley problems. His more recent social scientific research examines strategies for reducing intergroup conflict and promoting effective giving, while a separate strand of his neuroscientific work investigates how the brain combines concepts to form complex thoughts.

== Education and career ==
Greene attended high school in Fort Lauderdale, Broward County, Florida. He briefly attended the Wharton School of the University of Pennsylvania before transferring to Harvard University. He earned a bachelor's degree in philosophy from Harvard in 1997, followed by a Ph.D. in philosophy at Princeton University under the supervision of David Lewis and Gilbert Harman. Peter Singer also served on his dissertation committee. His 2002 dissertation, The Terrible, Horrible, No Good, Very Bad Truth About Morality and What to Do About It, argues against moral-realist language and in defense of non-realist utilitarianism as a better framework for resolving disagreements. Greene served as a postdoctoral fellow at Princeton in the Neuroscience of Cognitive Control Laboratory, working with Jonathan Cohen, before returning to Harvard in 2006 as an assistant professor. In 2011, he became the John and Ruth Hazel Associate Professor of the Social Sciences, and in 2014 was promoted to full professor of psychology. In 2026, he was named the inaugural Alfred and Rebecca Lin Professor of Civil Discourse, a chair established at Harvard to support research and teaching on depolarization and constructive disagreement.

== Dual-process theory ==
Greene and colleagues have advanced a dual process theory of moral judgment, suggesting that moral judgments are determined by both automatic, emotional responses and controlled, conscious reasoning. In particular, Greene argues that the "central tension" in ethics between deontology (rights- or duty-based moral theories) and consequentialism (outcome-based theories) reflects the competing influences of these two types of processes:

Characteristically deontological judgments are preferentially supposed by automatic emotional responses, while characteristically consequentialist judgments are preferentially supported by conscious reasoning and allied processes of cognitive control.

In one of the first experiments to suggest a moral dual-process model, Greene and colleagues showed that people making judgments about "personal" moral dilemmas (like whether to push one person in front of an oncoming trolley in order to save five others) engaged several brain regions associated with emotion that were not activated by judgments that were more "impersonal" (like whether to pull a switch to redirect a trolley from a track on which it would kill five people onto a track on which it would kill one other person instead). They also found that for the dilemmas involving "personal" moral questions, those who did make the intuitively unappealing choice had longer reaction times than those who made the more emotionally pleasant decision.

A follow-up study compared "easy" personal moral questions to which subjects had fast reaction times against "hard" dilemmas (like the footbridge problem) to which they had slow reaction times. When responding to the hard problems, subjects displayed increased activity in the anterior dorsolateral prefrontal cortex (DLPFC) and inferior parietal lobes—areas associated with cognitive processing—as well as the anterior cingulate cortex—which has been implicated in error detection between two confusing inputs, as in the Stroop task). This comparison demonstrated that harder problems activated different brain regions, but it did not prove differential activity for the same moral problem depending on the answer given. This was done in the second part of the study, in which the authors showed that for a given question, those subjects who made the utilitarian choices did have higher activity in the anterior DLPFC and the right inferior parietal lobe than subjects making non-utilitarian choices.

These two studies were correlational, but others have since suggested a causal impact of emotional vs. cognitive processing on deontological vs. utilitarian judgments. A 2008 study by Greene showed that cognitive load caused subjects to take longer to respond when they made a utilitarian moral judgment but had no effect on response time when they made a non-utilitarian judgment, suggesting that the utilitarian thought processes required extra cognitive effort.

Subsequent lesion studies have been cited as supporting the dual-process account. Patients with damage to the ventromedial prefrontal cortex produce markedly more utilitarian judgments on high-conflict personal dilemmas than controls, alongside blunted emotional responses indexed by skin conductance. The opposite shift toward deontological judgment has been reported in patients with basolateral amygdala damage, who have deficits in instrumental reasoning. Fiery Cushman has reframed the dual-process distinction in terms of model-based versus model-free systems for learning and decision-making, with utilitarian judgments reflecting model-based evaluation of outcomes and characteristically deontological judgments reflecting model-free values attached directly to actions. Large-scale empirical tests have broadly supported Greene's specific predictions about the situational factors that affect moral judgments: a 45-country replication found the personal-force effect to be culturally universal, with the personal-force-by-intention interaction replicating in Western samples. With respect to the roles of intuition and deliberation, a 2025 meta-analysis reported a small overall effect favoring intuitive deontology (OR = 1.18), but the effect was substantially larger (OR = 1.30) when restricted to dilemmas involving both personal force and instrumentality — the conditions Greene's account specifically predicts.

Greene's 2008 article "The Secret Joke of Kant's Soul" argues that Kantian/deontological ethics tends to be driven by emotional responses and is best understood as rationalization rather than rationalism—an attempt to justify intuitive moral judgments post-hoc, although the author states that his argument is speculative and will not be conclusive. Several philosophers have written critical responses.

== Moral Tribes ==
Drawing on dual-process theory, as well as evolutionary psychology and other neuroscience work, Greene's book Moral Tribes (2013) explores how our ethical intuitions play out in the modern world.

Greene posits that humans have an instinctive, automatic tendency to cooperate with others in their social group on tragedy of the commons scenarios ("me versus us"). For example, in a cooperative investment game, people are more likely to do what's best for the group when they're under time pressure or when they're primed to "go with their gut", and inversely, cooperation can be inhibited by rational calculation. However, on questions of inter-group harmony ("us versus them"), automatic intuitions run into a problem, which Greene calls the "tragedy of commonsense morality". The same ingroup loyalty that achieves cooperation within a community leads to hostility between communities. In response, Greene proposes a "metamorality" based on a "common currency" that all humans can agree upon and suggests that utilitarianism—or as he calls it, "deep pragmatism"—is up to the task.

=== Reception ===
Moral Tribes received multiple positive reviews.

Thomas Nagel critiques the book by suggesting that Greene is too quick to conclude utilitarianism specifically from the general goal of constructing an impartial morality; for example, he says, Immanuel Kant and John Rawls offer other impartial approaches to ethical questions.

Robert Wright calls Greene's proposal for global harmony ambitious and adds, "I like ambition!" But he also claims that people have a tendency to see facts in a way that serves their ingroup, even if there's no disagreement about the underlying moral principles that govern the disputes. "If indeed we're wired for tribalism", Wright explains, "then maybe much of the problem has less to do with differing moral visions than with the simple fact that my tribe is my tribe and your tribe is your tribe. Both Greene and Paul Bloom cite studies in which people were randomly divided into two groups and immediately favored members of their own group in allocating resources—even when they knew the assignment was random." Instead, Wright proposes that "nourishing the seeds of enlightenment indigenous to the world's tribes is a better bet than trying to convert all the tribes to utilitarianism—both more likely to succeed, and more effective if it does."

Greene's metamorality of deep pragmatism has been criticized by Steven Kraaijeveld and Hanno Sauer for being based on conflicting arguments about moral truth.

In Moral Tribes, Greene argues that reasoned thought is important in moral decision-making, while also acknowledging the significant role that emotions play in the process. He supports this claim with compelling evidence, including results from neurobiological studies. Greene's willingness to recognize the importance of emotional-based moral reasoning is a significant development in bridging the gap between the continental and analytic schools of philosophy, as the latter tends to prioritize objective reasoning over subjective, emotional approaches.

== Applied research ==
Following the publication of Moral Tribes, Greene shifted a substantial portion of his research toward behaviorally informed interventions aimed at real-world impact, particularly in the domains of charitable giving and intergroup conflict. With Lucius Caviola, Greene co-founded Giving Multiplier in 2020, an online donation platform designed to increase effective giving by allowing donors to split their contributions between a personal favorite charity and an expert-recommended highly effective charity. In a 2023 paper in Science Advances, Caviola and Greene reported that this "donation bundling" technique increased donations to highly effective charities by 76%, with an additional 55% boost achieved through a system they called "micromatching," in which donors willing to contribute matching funds incentivize others to give more effectively.

Greene's lab also developed Tango, a two-player cooperative online quiz game designed to reduce political animosity by pairing members of opposing political groups as teammates. In a 2025 paper in Nature Human Behaviour led by doctoral student Lucas Woodley, the team reported results from five randomized controlled trials with nearly 5,000 U.S. participants showing that a single session of Tango decreased negative partisanship and increased warmth and financial generosity toward members of the opposing party, with effects persisting for up to four months. The authors characterized the magnitude of the effect as comparable to reversing approximately 15 years of rising polarization in American political life.

== Awards and distinctions ==
Greene received the 2012 Stanton Prize from the Society for Philosophy and Psychology. In 2013, Greene was awarded the Roslyn Abramson Award, given annually to Harvard faculty "in recognition of his or her excellence and sensitivity in teaching undergraduates". In 2026, Greene was named the inaugural Alfred and Rebecca Lin Professor of Civil Discourse at Harvard, a position established to support research and teaching on depolarization and constructive disagreement.

== Bibliography ==
- Greene, Joshua D; Sommerville, R Brian; Nystrom, Leigh E; Darley, John M; Cohen, Jonathan D (2001). "An fMRI investigation of emotional engagement in moral judgment". Science. 293 (5537): 2105–2108. Bibcode:2001Sci...293.2105G. doi:10.1126/science.1062872. PMID 11557895. S2CID 1437941.
- Greene, Joshua; Jonathan Haidt (2002). "How (and where) does moral judgment work?". Trends in Cognitive Sciences. 6 (12): 517–523. doi:10.1016/S1364-6613(02)02011-9. PMID 12475712. S2CID 6777806.
- Greene, Joshua D; Nystrom, Leigh E; Engell, Andrew D; Darley, John M; Cohen, Jonathan D (2004). "The neural bases of cognitive conflict and control in moral judgment". Neuron. 44 (2): 389–400. doi:10.1016/j.neuron.2004.09.027. hdl:10983/15961. PMID 15473975. S2CID 9061712.
- Greene, Joshua D (2008). "The Secret Joke of Kant's Soul". In Sinnott-Armstrong, Walter (ed.). Moral Psychology: The Neuroscience of Morality: Emotion, Brain Disorders, and Development. MIT Press. pp. 35–80. ISBN 978-0-262-19564-5.

== See also ==
- Dual process theory
- Experimental philosophy
- Evolutionary psychology
- Giving Multiplier
