= Fiery Cushman =

American psychologist

- Awards: Distinguished Scientific Award for Early Career Contributions (2018, American Psychological Association), Stanton Prize (2014, Society for Philosophy and Psychology), Daniel M. Wegner Theoretical Innovation Prize (2014, Society for Personality and Social Psychology)

Academic background
- Education: Harvard University (AB, PhD)

Academic work
- Discipline: Psychology
- Sub-discipline: Moral psychology Social neuroscience Reinforcement learning Theory of mind
- Institutions: Harvard University; Brown University

Fiery A. Cushman is an American academic working as a professor of psychology at Harvard University, where he directs the Moral Psychology Research Laboratory.

== Early life and education ==
Cushman's father was a Washington, D.C. correspondent for The New York Times, and his mother taught psychology at American University. The oldest of three siblings, he attended Georgetown Day School. Cushman graduated from Harvard University in 2003 with a Bachelor of Arts in biology. He received a PhD in psychology from Harvard in 2008.

== Career ==
From 2008 to 2011, Cushman was a postdoctoral researcher at Harvard, working with Joshua Greene. From 2011 to 2014, Cushman worked as an associate professor of cognitive, linguistic, and psychological sciences at Brown University. Cushman returned to Harvard in 2014, where he works as a professor of psychology and director of the Moral Psychology Research Laboratory. From 2018 to 2021, he was the John L. Loeb Associate Professor of the Social Sciences. Since 2021, he has been a professor of psychology. His research focuses on morality, social neuroscience, reinforcement learning, decision making, theory of mind, and experimental philosophy.
