= John M. Doris =

American philosopher (born 1963)

- Born: 1963 (age 62–63)
- Awards: Stanton Prize, NEH fellowship, ACLS fellowship

Education
- Education: Cornell University (BA); University of Michigan, Ann Arbor (PhD)

Philosophical work
- Era: 21st-century philosophy
- Region: Western philosophy
- Institutions: Cornell University
- Main interests: moral philosophy

John M. Doris (born 1963) is an American philosopher and Professor of Philosophy and Peter L. Dyson Professor of Ethics in Organizations and Life at Cornell University. He is known for his works on moral philosophy.

== Life and academic career ==
John M. Doris was born and raised in Ithaca, New York, to John L. Doris, a developmental psychologist, and Marjorie Doris, a pediatrician. He was the last of their five children, with four older sisters, all of which have doctoral degrees.

Doris attended Hobart College for two years before transferring to Cornell studying philosophy at both. After his undergraduate degree he was accepted into University of Michigan. At Michigan he studied under Stephen Darwall, Jim Joyce, and Richard Nisbett, with Allan Gibbard as his dissertation director. He completed his MA in 1990 and his Ph.D. in 1996.

Doris was the recipient of the Society for Philosophy and Psychology’s Stanton Prize in 2007. In 2025, he was also awarded the APA Joseph B. Gittler Award for his book Character Trouble:Undisciplined Essays on Moral Agency and Personality (Oxford University Press, 2022).

== Books ==
- Lack of Character: Personality and Moral Behavior (Cambridge, 2002)
- Talking to Our Selves: Reflection, Ignorance, and Agency (Oxford, 2015)
- Character Trouble: Undisciplined Essays on Moral Agency and Personality (Oxford, 2022)
- The Moral Psychology Handbook (ed.) (Oxford, 2010)
- The Oxford Handbook of Moral Psychology (ed.) (Oxford, 2022)
