= Sarah-Jane Leslie =

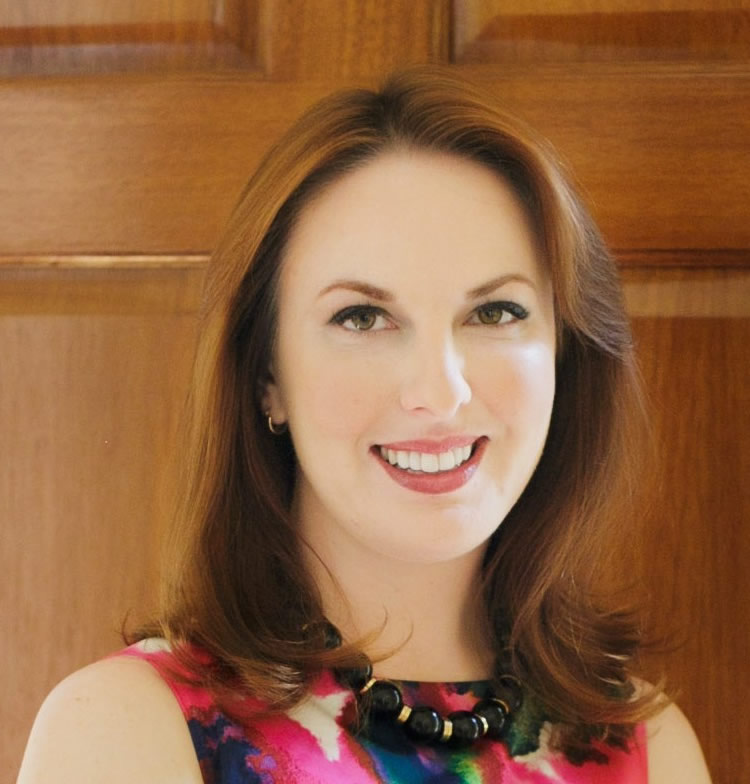
- Sarah-Jane Leslie
- Title: Class of 1943 Professor of Philosophy

Academic background
- Education: Rutgers University, Princeton University

Academic work
- Discipline: Philosophy
- Sub-discipline: Empirical Philosophy of Mind; Social Cognition
- Institutions: Princeton University

Sarah-Jane Leslie is the Class of 1943 Professor of Philosophy and former Dean of the Graduate School at Princeton University, where she is also affiliated faculty in the Department of Psychology, the Kahneman-Treisman Center for Behavioral Science and Public Policy, the Program in Cognitive Science, the Program in Linguistics, and the University Center for Human Values.

She is known for her work on the cognitive underpinnings of generic generalizations and the relationship between these generalizations and social cognition, and her work on perceptions of brilliance and academic gender gaps. She is the author of numerous articles in philosophy and psychology, and has published in journals such as Science, Proceedings of the National Academy of Sciences (PNAS), Cognitive Psychology, and Philosophical Review. Leslie's work has been discussed by various media outlets, including The Washington Post, NBC, and The Wall Street Journal, and on the radio at NPR, WHYY, and CBC Radio.

== Education and career ==
In 1998 Leslie entered Rutgers University as an undergraduate majoring in cognitive science, mathematics and philosophy. She graduated in 2002 summa cum laude. She received her Ph.D. in philosophy in 2007 from Princeton University and was subsequently appointed as Assistant Professor to the philosophy faculty that same year. In 2013 she was awarded tenure and promoted to Full Professor, skipping the position of associate professor. In 2014, she was named Class of 1943 Professor of Philosophy.

Leslie served as Dean of the Graduate School at Princeton University from January 1, 2018, until July 1, 2021.

Prior to being named dean, Leslie held several administrative, professional, and service positions at Princeton and served on numerous committees, including the Faculty Advisory Committee on Diversity and the Committee on Appointments and Advancements. Between 2014 and 2017 Leslie was the Director of Princeton's Program in Linguistics, the Director of the Program in Cognitive Science, which she founded in 2015, Acting Chair of the Department of Philosophy, and Vice Dean for Faculty Development in the Office of the Dean of the Faculty.

In 2013, Leslie recorded a series of videos titled Philosophical Conversations, in which she interviewed several prominent philosophers including Rae Langton, Roger Scruton, Joshua Knobe and Kwame Anthony Appiah. The series was sponsored by the Marc Sanders Foundation and made available free to promote excellence in philosophy.

== Research areas ==
Leslie's main research interests lie at the intersection of philosophy and psychology. Much of her work has focused on generic generalizations, which are articulated in language via sentences such as "tigers are striped", "a duck lays eggs", "mosquitoes carry West Nile virus". These sentences are difficult to analyze from the perspective of formal semantics, but are nonetheless easy for young children to acquire and process. These findings and others have led Leslie and her collaborators to hypothesize that generic sentences articulate cognitively fundamental, default generalizations – that is, the judgments formed by our cognitive systems' most basic way of generalizing information about kinds and categories.

Leslie's work has shown important connections between generic generalizations and social cognition. For example, she and NYU psychologist Marjorie Rhodes—along with Rhodes' student Christina Tworek—found that when preschool-aged children hear a novel social group described with generic language, they come to think of the group in essentialist terms—that is, as marking deep, important, and inherent distinctions amongst people. Further, they found that when parents themselves hold such beliefs about a social group, they tend to produce more generic language when describing the group to their children. Thus, generic language may be an important and powerful mechanism by which social essentialist beliefs are implicitly communicated across generations. More generally, Leslie's work has pointed to multiple connections between generic generalizations and social essentialism, stereotyping, and prejudice.

More recently, Leslie and NYU psychologist Andrei Cimpian have studied the impact of stereotypes that link brilliance with men more so than women. In a 2015 paper published in Science, they found that academic disciplines that are perceived to require brilliance for success have larger gender gaps, even when adjusting for standardized test scores and other factors. In subsequent work, they found that even the frequency of adjectives like "brilliant" and "genius" in teaching evaluations can predict how diverse an academic field is. Their work has also examined the developmental roots of these stereotypes. In an article published in Science in 2017 with psychologist Lin Bian, they found that girls begin to absorb stereotypes linking brilliance with males by age 6. Further, 6- and 7-year-old girls show less engagement and motivation than boys when an activity is described as being for kids who are "really, really smart," but not when it is described as being for kids who "work really, really hard." This suggests that stereotypes about brilliance may impact girls’ choices from a very young age. As of January 2017, both Science papers were in the journal's top 1% for media uptake and attention according to Altmetrics.

== Awards and fellowships ==
Leslie has received numerous awards and fellowships, including the Class of 1943 Professorship in Philosophy, the Jacob T. Viner University Preceptorship, the Mrs. Giles Whiting Honorific Fellowship, and a National Science Foundation Graduate Research Fellowship. In collaboration with Dr. Marjorie Rhodes and Dr. Andrei Cimpian, she has been the recipient of multiple grants from the National Science Foundation, the National Institutes of Health, and other sources. Cimpian and Leslie's work on academic gender gaps was cited as one of the most interesting scientific findings of 2015 by Edge. Leslie has delivered the Gareth Evans Memorial Lecture at Oxford University, and the Daniel Greenberg Distinguished Scholar Lecture at Reed College. She was awarded the Stanton Prize by the Society for Philosophy and Psychology, and named a 250th Anniversary Fellow of Rutgers University.

== Family ==
Leslie's father, Alan Leslie, is Distinguished Professor of Psychology and Cognitive Science at Rutgers University.

== Selected publications ==
- Leslie, S.J. (2007). Generics and the Structure of the Mind. Philosophical Perspectives, vol 21, no. 1, pp. 375–403.
- Leslie, S.J. (2008). Generics: Cognition and Acquisition. Philosophical Review, vol. 117, no. 1, pp. 1–47.
- Leslie, S. J., Khemlani, S., & Glucksberg, S. (2011). "All ducks lay eggs: The Generic Overgeneralization Effect." Journal of Memory and Language, 35, 15–31.
- Rhodes, M., Leslie, S. J. & Tworek, C. (2012). "Cultural Transmission of Social Essentialism.: Proceedings of the National Academy of Sciences, 109(34), 13526-13531.
- Leslie, S. J., & Gelman, S. A. (2012). "Quantified statements are recalled as generics: Evidence from preschool children and adults." Cognitive Psychology, 64, 186–214.
- Leslie, S.J. (2013). Essence and Natural Kinds: When Science Meets Preschooler Intuition. Oxford Studies in Epistemology, 4, 108–165.
- Leslie, S.J., Cimpian, A., Meyer, M., & Freeland, E. (2015). Expectations of Brilliance Underlie Gender Distributions Across Academic Disciplines. Science, 347(6219), 262–265.
- Bian, L. Leslie, S.J, & Cimpian, A. (2017). Gender stereotypes about intellectual ability emerge early and influence children's interests. Science, 355(6323), 389–391.
