= Marjorie Rhodes (psychologist) =

Developmental psychologist

- Education: University of Michigan
- Known for: Social essentialism; conceptual development; social cognition
- Awards: Boyd McCandless Young Scientist Award
- Scientific career
- Fields: Developmental psychology
- Workplaces: New York University

Marjorie Rhodes is a developmental psychologist and professor of psychology at New York University (NYU). She studies how children form concepts and social categories, with a particular emphasis on social essentialism—beliefs that social groups reflect deep, underlying kinds—and how these beliefs influence stereotyping, prejudice, and social inequality. Rhodes directs the Conceptual Development and Social Cognition Lab (also known as the Kid Concepts Lab) at NYU.

Her work has been recognized with several awards, including the Division 7 (Developmental Psychology) Boyd McCandless Young Scientist Award from the American Psychological Association, a James S. McDonnell Foundation Scholar Award, the Steve Reznick Early Career Award from the Cognitive Development Society, the Association for Psychological Science "Rising Star" designation, the Stanton Prize from the Society for Philosophy and Psychology, and New York University's Golden Dozen Teaching Award.

== Early life and education ==
Rhodes completed a Bachelor of Science degree in biopsychology and cognitive science at the University of Michigan in 2003, graduating cum laude. She remained at Michigan for graduate study and earned a Ph.D. in developmental psychology in 2009.

== Career ==
After completing her doctorate, Rhodes joined the Department of Psychology at New York University as an assistant professor in 2009. She was promoted to associate professor in 2015 and to professor of psychology in 2020, and has served as associate chair of the department. Her research program is based at NYU and at partner sites such as the Children's Museum of Manhattan and the American Museum of Natural History, where she conducts studies of children's learning in informal science environments.

== Research ==
Rhodes's research examines how children form concepts, categories, and explanations, and how these processes support social cognition. A central focus of her work is social essentialism, the tendency to treat social categories (such as gender or race) as if they reflect underlying, unchanging kinds of people. In a widely cited paper in the Proceedings of the National Academy of Sciences, she and her colleagues tested how generic language contributes to the cultural transmission of essentialist beliefs. Across several experiments, hearing generic statements about a novel social group led both children and adults to infer that group members shared stable traits and to make broader predictions about them, and experimentally increasing parents' essentialist beliefs caused them to use more generic language when discussing social groups with their children.

In subsequent work, Rhodes and collaborators have investigated how essentialist beliefs relate to support for social hierarchies and to the development of prejudice, finding that experimentally inducing essentialist beliefs about a novel social category can lead children to withhold resources from out-group members, and that stronger essentialist beliefs are associated with greater endorsement of group-based hierarchies. Her research program also addresses how essentialist beliefs relate to children's reasoning about status, obligation, and moral evaluation, as well as their understanding of social categories more broadly.

Another line of Rhodes's research investigates how language shapes children's engagement with science. In a study published in Psychological Science, she and her co-authors found that describing science in terms of actions ("doing science") rather than identities ("being a scientist") increased young girls' persistence in a science activity and their willingness to choose science-related tasks, suggesting that small linguistic changes can help reduce early gender gaps in science engagement.

Rhodes has also authored a monograph, The Development of Social Essentialism, published in the Advances in Child Development and Behavior series, which synthesizes evidence on how essentialist beliefs about social kinds emerge across childhood and how they relate to social behavior and intergroup relations.

== Selected publications ==
- Rhodes, M., Leslie, S.-J., & Tworek, C. M. (2012). "Cultural transmission of social essentialism." Proceedings of the National Academy of Sciences of the United States of America, 109(34), 13526–13531.
- Rhodes, M., & Mandalaywala, T. M. (2017). "The development and developmental consequences of social essentialism." Wiley Interdisciplinary Reviews: Cognitive Science, 8(4), e1437.
- Mandalaywala, T. M., Amodio, D. M., & Rhodes, M. (2018). "Essentialism promotes racial prejudice by increasing endorsement of social hierarchies." Social Psychological and Personality Science, 9(4), 461–469.
- Rhodes, M., Leslie, S.-J., Yee, K. M., & Saunders, K. (2019). "Subtle linguistic cues increase girls' engagement in science." Psychological Science, 30(3), 455–466.

== Awards and honors ==
Rhodes's research and teaching have been recognized with numerous awards, including:

- 2013 – Association for Psychological Science, "Rising Star" award.
- 2017 – Boyd McCandless Young Scientist Award, Division 7, American Psychological Association.
- 2017 – James S. McDonnell Foundation Scholar Award.
- 2017 – Steve Reznick Early Career Award, Cognitive Development Society.
- 2020 – Stanton Prize, Society for Philosophy and Psychology.
- 2020 – Golden Dozen Teaching Award, New York University.
