= James Andreoni =

American economist

James Andreoni (1959-2026) was a professor in the Economics Department of the University of California, San Diego where he directed the EconLab. His research focused on behavioral economics, experimental economics, and public economics. Andreoni was well known for his research on altruism, and in particular for coining the term warm-glow giving to describe personal gains from altruistic acts. Andreoni's research used a mixture of economic theory, experiments, and standard analysis of survey data to explore a variety of topics including: moral decision making, time preferences, charitable giving and altruistic decisions. His research has been described as expanding “our understanding of donors and charities and our broader understanding of public goods and expenditures.”

== Career ==
Born in Beloit, Wisconsin, Andreoni received his bachelor's degree in economics from the University of Minnesota in 1981, and his MA and PhD in economics from the University of Michigan in 1986. He worked at the University of Wisconsin-Madison from 1986 until 2005. He moved to his final position at the University of California, San Diego in January 2006. According to IDEAS/RePEc as of 2018 he was ranked among the top 1% of economists in the United States. He was the co-editor of the Journal of Public Economics, as well as an associate editor for the American Economic Review and Econometrica, among others.

From 1986 to 2005 Andreoni held positions at University of Wisconsin, Madison. From 1986 to 1992 he worked as an assistant professor. He then became an associate professor in 1992 and then became a professor in 1996. He left University of Wisconsin, Madison in 2005. From 2006 through 2026 he was a professor at University of California, San Diego. From 2007 to 2009 he was the president of the Economic Science Association.

== Selected awards, honors and appointments ==
He was an Alfred P. Sloan Research Fellow from 1992 to 1994. He was a Research Associate for the National Bureau of Economic Research from 2009 - 2026 and was elected as a Fellow to the Econometric Society in 2011, which is the same year he was appointed a Fellow of the Society For the Advancement of Economic Theory.

Andreoni was the President of the Economic Science Association, the professional organization of experimental economists, from 2007 to 2009 and served as a co-founder of the Association for the Study of Generosity in Economics (ASGE), and had served as vice president until 2026.
