= Warm-glow giving =

Economic theory

Warm-glow giving is an economic theory describing the emotional reward of giving to others. According to the original warm-glow model developed by James Andreoni (1989, 1990), people experience a sense of joy and satisfaction for "doing their part" to help others. This satisfaction - or "warm glow" - represents the selfish pleasure derived from "doing good", regardless of the actual impact of one's generosity. Within the warm-glow framework, people may be "impurely altruistic", meaning they simultaneously maintain both altruistic and egoistic (selfish) motivations for giving. This may be partially due to the fact that "warm glow" sometimes gives people credit for the contributions they make, such as a plaque with their name or a system where they can make donations publicly so other people know the "good" they are doing for the community.

Whereas "pure altruists" (sometimes referred to as "perfect altruists") are motivated solely by the desire to provide for a recipient, impure altruists are also motivated by the joy of giving (warm glow). Importantly, warm glow is distinctly non-pecuniary, meaning it arises independent of the possibility of financial reward. Therefore, the warm glow phenomenon is distinct from reciprocal altruism, which may imply a direct financial incentive.

Warm-glow giving is a useful economic framework to consider public good provision, collective action problems, charitable giving, and gifting behavior. The existence of a warm glow helps explain the absence of complete crowding-out of private giving by public grants, as predicted by classical economic models under the neutrality hypothesis. Beyond economics, warm glow has been applied to sociology, political science, environmental policy, healthcare, and business. Conceptually, warm-glow giving is related to the notion of a "helper's high" and appears to be resilient across cultures.

== Background in moral philosophy ==
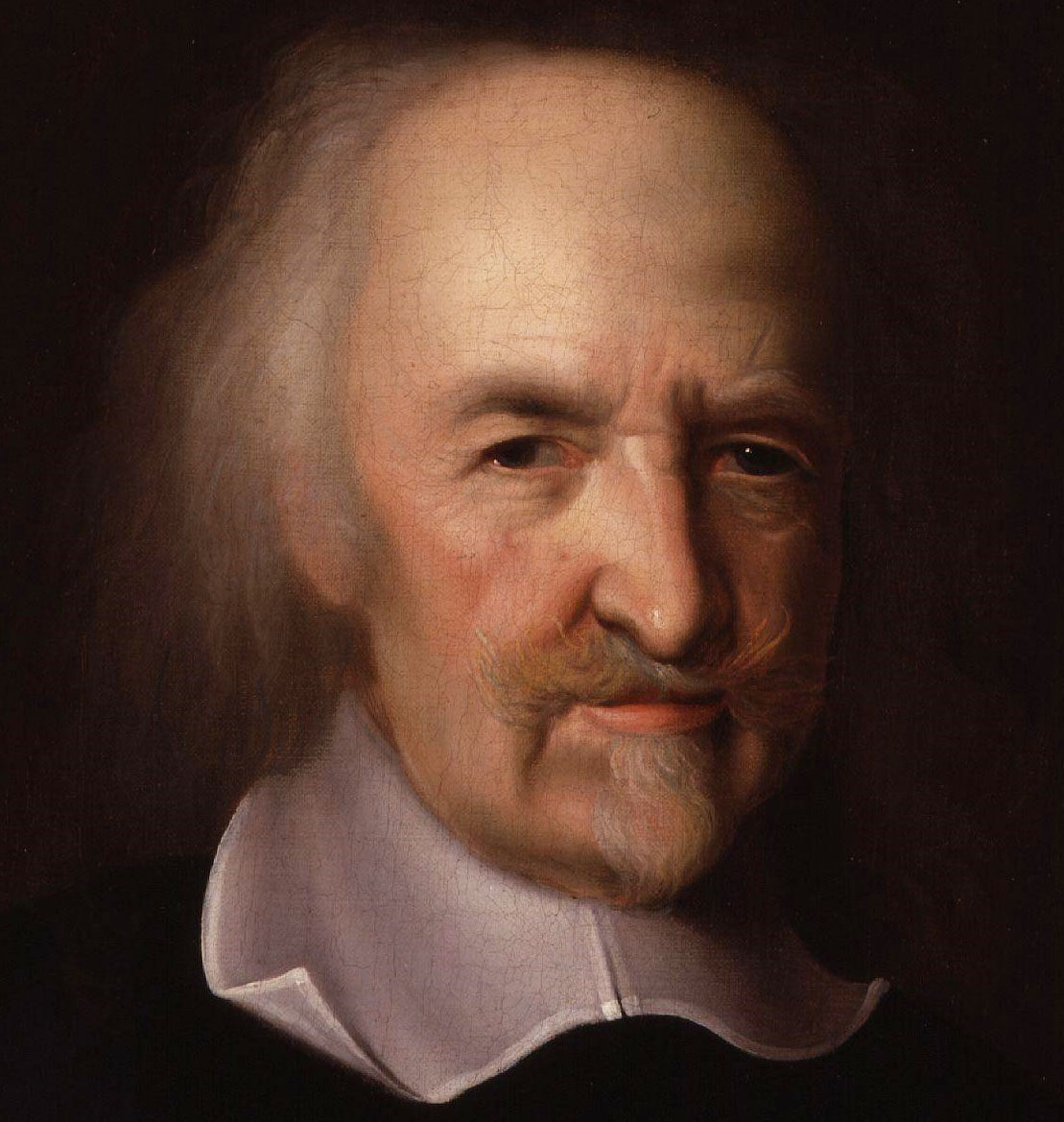
Thomas Hobbes was a stern advocate of psychological egoism, claiming "No man giveth but with intention of good to himself".

Warm glow is built upon the idea of impure altruism: the blend of both altruistic and egoistic desires to help others. Philosophers have debated this idea since the time of the ancient Greeks. In the Socratic dialogues, motivation may be traced to an egoistic concern for one's own welfare, thus denying the plausibility of pure altruism. Similarly, Plato's organization of motivations as responses to hunger-based desires highlights the foundational importance of egoism in all social interactions. However, in Nicomachean Ethics and Eudemian Ethics, Aristotle considers both the possibility and necessity of altruism to fulfill high-order eudaimonic goals, thus setting the stage for an ongoing philosophical debate. Hobbes, Kant, Nietzsche, Bentham, J.S. Mill argued against the possibility of pure altruism and advanced the doctrine of psychological egoism, while others (Butler, Hume, Rousseau, Adam Smith, Nagel) argued for the existence of altruistic motives. Conceptually, the warm-glow model represents a stylized compromise between these two perspectives, allowing for individuals to be purely altruistic, purely egoistic, or impurely altruistic. Warm glow is at least tangentially related to the topic of free will, as people should only reap the psychological reward of helping if they freely choose to do so.

== Background in economics ==
=== Departure from Classical theory ===
The normative theory of Ricardian equivalence suggests private spending should be unresponsive to fiscal policy because forward-looking individuals smooth their consumption, consistent with Modigliani's life-cycle hypothesis. Applied to the provision of charities or public goods, Ricardian equivalence and the classical assumption of pure altruism together support the neutrality hypothesis, implying perfect substitutability between private and public contributions. The neutrality hypothesis assumes rational economic agents are indifferent to whether a cause is funded by the private or public sector; only the level of funding is relevant. A consequence of neutrality under perfect altruism is that government grants should completely crowd-out private donations. That is, a dollar given by the government takes the place of a dollar that would have been given by a private citizen. To illustrate, economic agents operating under the neutrality hypothesis would give to a cause until complete provision, beyond which they would contribute nothing. This is consistent with Andreoni's conceptualization of "pure altruism"; however, it is inconsistent with impure altruism or pure egoism. Thus, warm glow and the failure to act as purely altruistic present fundamental challenges to the neutrality hypothesis and Ricardian equivalence. In economics, violations to the neutrality hypothesis pose serious concerns for macroeconomic policies involving taxation and redistribution; and microeconomic theories for collective action and public good provision. Several of Andreoni's contemporaries simultaneously provided evidence against neutrality-driven crowding-out effects, including Kingma (1989) and Khanna et al. (1995). Taken together, these findings offered a strong rebuke of the assumption that public grants crowd-out private donations to public goods.

=== Original model ===
Andreoni's economic model of impure altruism considers a simplistic world with only two goods: a private good and a public good. A given individual, endowed with wealth $(w_{i}),$faces the budget constraint: $w_{i} = x_{i} + g_{i},$where $x_{i}$represents consumption of a private good, and $g_{i}$represents the contribution to the public good. To the extent that $g_i$positively contributes to utility, it may be interpreted as the degree of warm glow. It follows that the total provision of the public good, G, is simply: $\sum_{i}^{n} (g_{i}),$and the total contributions to the public good from all other individuals is denoted as: $G_{-i} = \sum_{i \ne j}^n(g_{j}).$Thus, the public good is the sum of the $i^{th}$person's contribution $(g_{i}),$along with the total contributions of all other individuals $G_{-i}.$

(1) $G = g_{i} + G_{-i},$where $g_i \ge 0.$

All individuals in this naïve economy face the same utility functions, given by:

(2)$U_{i} = U_{i}(x_{i},G,g_{i}),$

where the utility functions represent the utility for private, egoistic consumption $U_{i}(x_{i});$the utility derived from the public good $U_{i}(G);$and the warm-glow utility of the contribution towards the public good $U_{i}(g_{i}).$An altruist should derive no additional utility from the act of giving: $U_{altruist} = f(x_i, G),$whereas a pure egoist derives pleasure only from the warm glow of giving, without care for the public good itself, hence $U_{egoist} = f(x_i,g_i).$

From the budget constraint and utility function, one can derive the utility maximization function, $max U_{i}(w_{i}+G_{-i}-G, G, G - G_{-i}),$which is the original utility function (2) transformed using the definition of the public good (1). This utility maximization function serves as the foundation for warm-glow model development

=== Implications ===
Assuming a strategy of utility maximization, the model of warm glow offers many important economic predictions. Specifically, it presents three contrarian insights to those of classical economics under Ricardian equivalence.

First, warm-glow theory predicts that income transfers will increase net giving only when income is transferred to more altruistic individuals. Second, it suggests that the provision of a public good is dependent upon the distribution of income within a population. Third, it suggests that public fund of public goods through lump-sum taxes will be more effective than relying upon altruism in the private sector. Individually and collectively, these propositions are in stark contrast to the laissez-faire doctrine of Ricardian economics. Following this original model, warm glow has conceptually evolved with new applications across disciplines to explain and encourage prosocial behavior.

== Background in psychology ==
Many of the advances in warm glow research stem not from economics, but from psychology. In particular, research on motivations and affect have played a key role in defining and operationalizing warm glow for broad application.

=== A motivational perspective ===
"...a millionaire does not really care whether his money does good or not, provided he finds his conscience eased and his social status improved by giving it away..." -George Bernard Shaw.

As illustrated in Shaw's quote, both intrinsic desires of conscience and extrinsic desires of social status may motivate giving. Warm glow has traditionally been restricted to intrinsic motivation, however this distinction is often murky.

There has been considerable inconsistency in the literature as to whether a warm glow refers to intrinsic or extrinsic motivation. According to Andreoni (2006), "putting warm-glow into the model is, while intuitively appealing, an admittedly ad hoc fix". Further elaborating on the topic, he and colleagues wrote that the concept was "originally a placeholder for more specific models of individual and social motivations". From this initial ambiguity, different authors have at times referred to the phenomenon as solely intrinsic, both intrinsic and extrinsic, or solely extrinsic. Some authors have made deliberate distinctions between prestige-seeking (extrinsic) and the intrinsic components of warm glow, but many have not. Conceptualization of warm glow as either intrinsic or extrinsic has implications for motivational crowding out, satiation effects, and expected magnitude.

==== Intrinsic warm glow ====
The most common and classically "correct" interpretation of warm glow is as a solely intrinsic phenomenon. Language referring to the "joy of giving", "the positive emotional experience from the act of helping others", "the moral satisfaction of helping others" and the "internal satisfaction of giving" suggests an intrinsic drive. The intrinsic component of warm glow is the private emotional benefit to giving.

==== Extrinsic warm glow ====
Much of the ambiguity surrounding the motivational processes of warm glow has arisen from the misclassification of extrinsic rewards to intrinsic processes. While intrinsic desires center upon emotional gains, extrinsic rewards may include recognition, identity signaling, and prestige. Extrinsic motivation may also take the form of punishment (negative warm glow), in the form of censure or blame. Some research has explicitly focused on extrinsic warm glow, such as "relational warm glow".

One area that has been frequently confused in the literature involves the classification of guilt, which is an introjected form of extrinsic motivation.

==== Importance of motivational classification ====
The classification of warm glow as either intrinsic or extrinsic has important ramifications for policy makers. The extensive body of literature on motivational crowding out suggests the efficacy of policies promoting altruistic behavior may be a function of whether pre-existing behavior is intrinsically or extrinsically motivated. The extent to which extrinsic incentives may be substitutes for intrinsic motivations depends upon the motivational classification of the warm glow model. Furthermore, intrinsic warm glow may be more resilient to satiation effects than extrinsic warm glow. Finally, the expected magnitude of a warm glow will be a function of how it is characterized. Models assuming a purely intrinsic warm glow should report lesser warm glows than models also including extrinsic components.

==== Empathy and the psychological determinants of warm glow ====
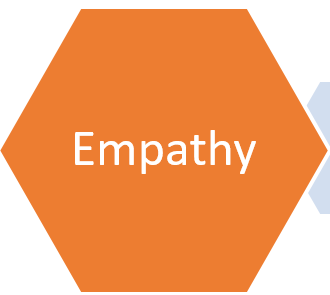
Empathy - Design Thinking

The phenomenon of warm-glow giving was originally introduced as an economic model. It its original form, the warm-glow model lacked a satisfactory explanation for the underlying psychological processes. Early studies of warm glow were deliberately vague in attributing the experience to a cause. A more recent body of research has identified several important determinants of warm glow, including social distance, vividness to the beneficiary, and guilt avoidance. Taken together, these observations suggest the warm glow may be best described as the visceral manifestation of empathy. This is consistent with the moral psychological literature of empathy, most notably as advanced by Batson. In his "empathy-altruism hypothesis", Batson claims that empathy ("feeling sympathetic, compassionate, warm, softhearted, tender") evokes a desire for other-regarding behavior.

==== Social distance ====
Social distance is an important determinant of warm glow, particularly in the framework of empathy. Prior research has examined the link between emotional arousal and social distance, finding that mutual suffering and shared joy both increase as a function of social similarity. Consistent with the "identifiable victim effect", research has shown that people express a greater willingness to help when others are known, as opposed to statistical.

==== Vividness to beneficiary ====
While the vividness of the beneficiary is captured in social distance, the vividness to the beneficiary refers to a beneficiary's ability to perceive that kindness has been done upon them. As a determinant of warm glow, vividness to the beneficiary operates on two levels. The primary level concerns whether a beneficiary is aware that kindness has been given to them, absent any attribution of the source. The secondary level involves the identifiability of the benefactor. Warm glow should be positively impacted by both levels for vividness.

==== Guilt ====
Recent work has identified guilt avoidance as an important component of warm glow. Some have even compared guilt as the "flip side" of warm glow. Parameterizing guilt as a component of warm glow allows for deficit values of warm glow, which was originally constrained to strictly positive values in Andreoni (1989, 1990). In a recent publication, Andreoni and colleagues explain this by writing: "Psychologists posit that giving is initiated by a stimulus that elevates sympathy or empathy in the mind of the potential giver, much as the smell of freshly baked bread can pique appetite. Resolving this feeling comes either by giving and feeling good or by not giving and feeling guilt." In other notable overviews of warm glow, this phenomenon has been characterized as "personal distress". In surveys of self-reported guilt, people experience roughly as much interpersonal and societal guilt as they do personal guilt. Furthermore, half of the survey respondents prefer to directly address and resolve their feelings of guilt. Taken together, these findings suggest a substantial component of guilt aversion.

== Neurobiological evidence ==
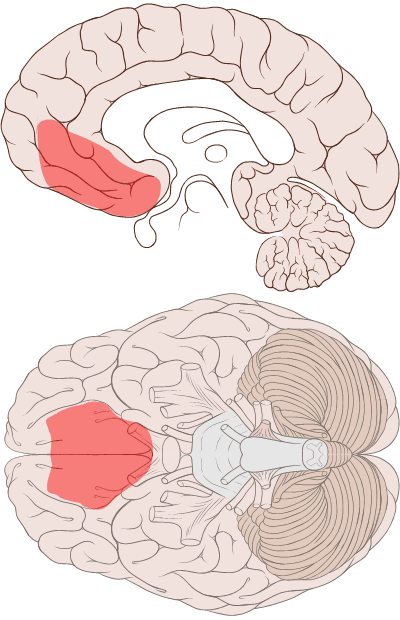

Evidence from neural imaging supports the warm-glow effect. A meta-analysis of 36 studies using functional magnetic resonance imaging demonstrated that the brain's reward networks are consistently activated when choices to give are made. This includes the ventromedial prefrontal cortex (vmPFC). Strategic decisions for which something is hoped for in return activate more anterior regions of vmPFC but decisions where nothing is expected in return activate posterior regions of vmPFC. This provides a biological distinction of decisions to help that depends on the expectation of external rewards.

== Applications ==
=== Voting ===
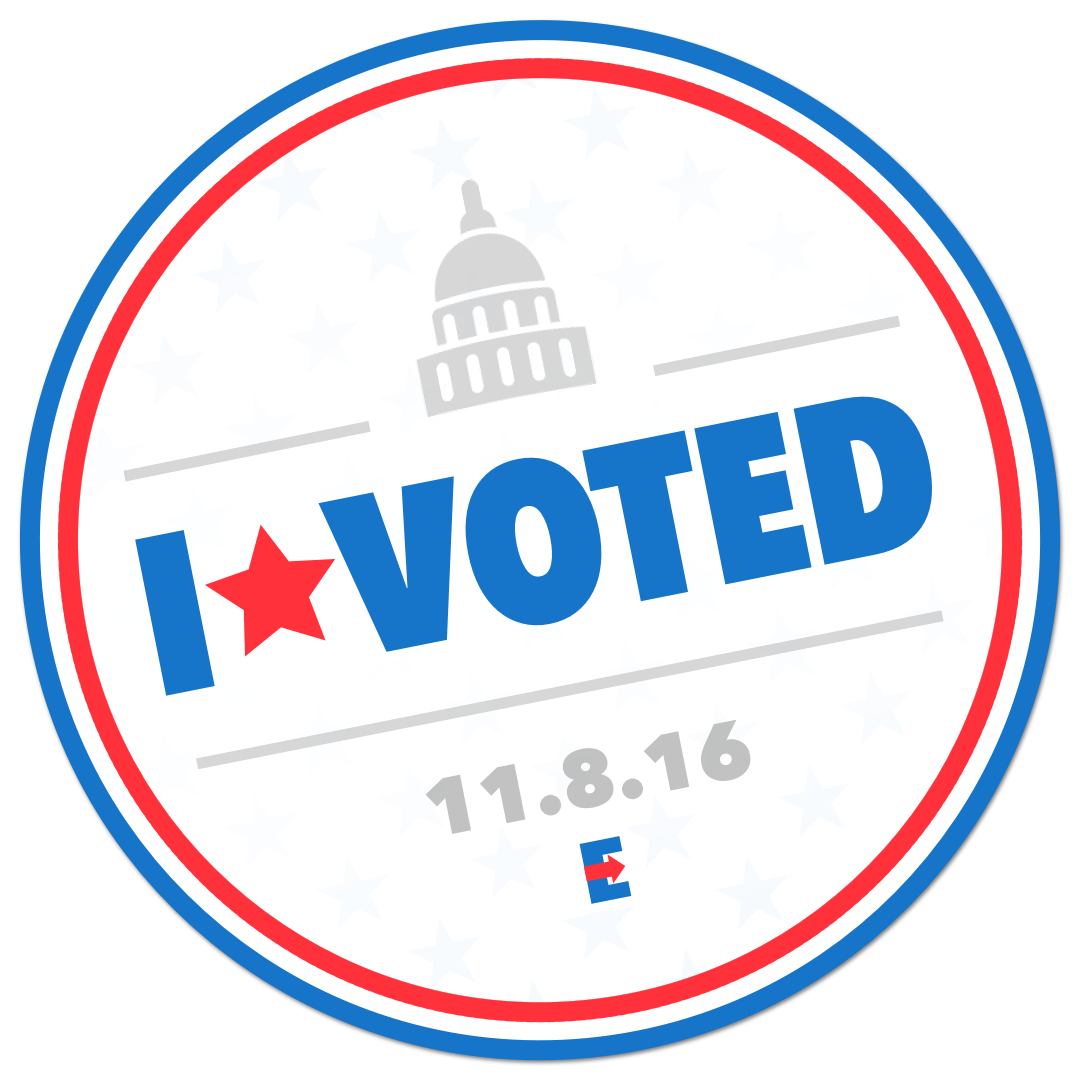
Early iterations of warm glow examined the decision to vote.

One of the earliest attempts to formally model the warm glow phenomenon can be found in "A Theory of the Calculus of Voting" by Riker and Ordeshook (1968). Resolving the paradox by which rational individuals would never expend the effort to vote due to the statistical near-improbability of "having their vote count" (casting the decisive vote), Riker and Ordeshook highlighted the psychological utility of voting for one's preferred candidate. Just as an economic warm glow motivates people to willingly forego their scarce resources, the psychological utility described in early voting models serves to explain otherwise irrational behavior. The warm glow of voting continues to be an important consideration in ethical voter models.

=== Environmental policy ===
In efforts to design effective, enduring, and efficient environmental interventions, many scholars and policy makers have focused on warm-glow effects. Because many forms of extrinsic rewards and punishments have failed to promote long-term improvements in environmentally conscious behavior, there is a growing emphasis on intrinsic warm glow. Intervention experiments offer promising results in areas such as supporting green energy, recycling and waste reduction, energy consumption, carpooling initiatives.

=== Business ===
==== Corporate social responsibility ====
Supporting businesses engaged in corporate social responsibility (CSR) initiatives may give consumers a vicarious warm glow. However, recent research suggests that consumers may expect to overpay when companies engage in CSR due to perceptions of price fairness. The implication that "doing good" carries a financial burden for businesses leads consumers to infer general price markups. This body of research cautions that corporate warm glows may be coupled with "cold prickles" of extra costs.

==== Product advertising ====
Warm glow can be a central element of cause marketing, in which products are paired with donations. When consumers are exposed to products with a direct cause marketing association, their appraisal of both the product and the company may improve due to warm glow. There is also evidence that product warm glows may play a role in a process called "hedonic licensing", in which consumers who perceive a moral surplus subsequently allow themselves more leeway to make selfish purchases.

=== Capital Markets ===
==== Inefficiency in sustainable investments ====
Warm glow in the context of sustainable investments involves investors deriving a sense of satisfaction from their responsible investment decision-making rather than from the actual impact. Private investors who engage in sustainable investments tend to rely on their emotions rather than adopting a calculated approach to evaluate the impact of their investment. Hence, utility stems from the prosocial act itself and, therefore, does not increase linearly with the level of impact. This implies that investors’ willingness to pay is insensible to the level of impact of an investment.

The concept of warm glow stands in contrast to the conventional behavior outlined in decision theory, often referred to as "consequentialism", where the utility of prosocial investors is directly linked to the level of impact generated by their investments. Private investors showing warm glow behavior typically seek opportunities to prevent climate change, leading to a higher willingness to pay for investments with a sustainable impact than investments with no impact. Leveraging warm glow becomes important in attracting funds for sustainable investments, encouraging investors to integrate sustainability considerations into their financial decisions.

However, there are drawbacks when investors prioritize optimizing their warm glow over maximizing impact. Companies are incentivized to engage in greenwashing or "impact-washing", promoting "light green" financial products that provide emotional satisfaction but lack substantial impact. Warm glow is independent of investors’ sustainability experience, implying that enhanced sustainability accounting won't contribute to realigning investors’ willingness to pay with the actual level of impact. To address this concern, positive externalities can be quantified in monetary terms so that investors adjust their willingness to pay coherently with the level of impact of the sustainable investment. Additionally, labels could realign investors' emotional preferences with the quantitative level of impact of a financial product and incentivize firms to offer real "green" products.

=== Philanthropy ===
==== Avoidance behaviors ====
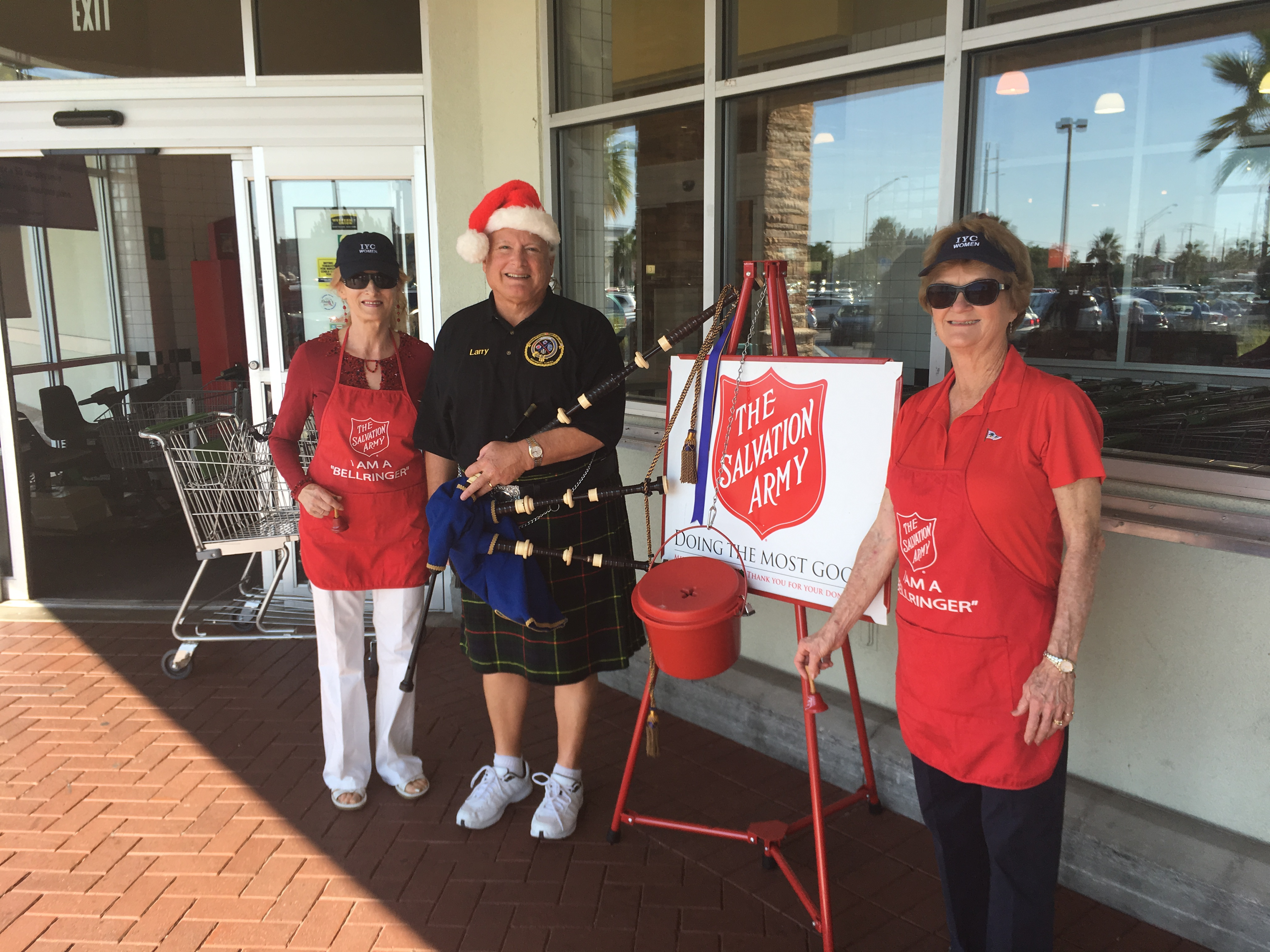
"Negative" warm glow may explain why empathetic individuals actively avoid charitable opportunities.

Common phenomena such as avoiding eye contact with beggars or adjusting one's route to avoid a solicitor may be explained using the warm glow model.

One behavioral consequence of warm glow is strategic avoidance of giving opportunities. According to this hypothesis, individuals anticipate their warm glow upon identifying a future giving opportunity. Assuming a functional form that allows warm glow to be negative (driven by a guilt of not giving), people may strategically and effortfully avoid giving situations. The strategic incentive is easily understood through the utility function $U_i = U_{i}(x_{i},G,g_{i}),$where the warm glow $(g_i),$is positive for a donation (joy of giving) and negative for not giving (guilt). For an agent who would suffer a disutility of giving at their desired level $(g_i^*)$because the marginal utility of private expenditure $(x_i)$exceeds the marginal utility of warm-glow giving, they should prefer to give nothing $(g_i^0).$Because giving nothing may be associated with guilt, the utility of $(g_i^0)$will be negative. Therefore, for a rational agent who cannot justify giving, $U_i(x_i,G,g_i^*) < U_i(x_i,G,g_i^0)$, can maximize their utility through avoiding a giving situation, effectively dropping the warm glow argument from their utility functions. Thus, $U_i(x_i,G,g_i^*) < U_i(x_i,G,g_i^0) < U_i(x_i, G, 0)$suggests avoidance of giving opportunities is a preferred strategy for individuals who experience guilt as a negative warm glow. Economic models assign a cost of effort to avoidance, and predict that people will incur such effort whenever $U_{i0} - c_i > U_{is},$where $U_{i0}$is the utility of not giving, $c_i$is the cost of avoidance, and $U_{is}$is the utility of giving to a solicitor, conditional upon not avoiding.

Through this lens, avoidance can be viewed as an economic commitment device, where a person commits to avoiding a situation (being asked to give) in which they are likely to surrender to temptation (giving). Central to this avoidance hypothesis is that individuals can anticipate their behavior in high-empathy "hot states", while in low-empathy "cold states". While this model assumes a high degree of sophistication on the part of the individual, research by Andreoni, Rao, and Trachtman explores this very phenomenon by observing avoidance and donation behavior of customers entering a supermarket during the holidays. Customers often walked to a further entrance to avoid solicitors for the Salvation Army. According to their model, "empathetically vulnerable" individuals who are not able to give (for budgetary reasons), faced the greatest incentive to avoid collectors because of the guilt they would experience upon saying "no".

==== Grouping behaviors ====
Charities may strategically employ categorical donor recognition. For example, a charitable organization may distinguish any gift between $500-$999.99 by a title distinct from that awarded for gifts above $1,000. As a consequence, the social signaling component of the warm-glow effect (in extrinsic operationalizations of warm glow) suggests individuals should be motivated to make the minimum donation to acquire their desired categorical status. Consistent with this hypothesis, research has indicated significant grouping behavior of donors around category minimums.

==== Inefficiency in charitable allocation ====
A majority of those who choose to give some portion of their wealth to charity support multiple different causes. Rather than giving 100% of their cumulative donations to the same source, there exists a widespread preference to distribute funds across charities. The warm glow model explains this by recognizing that givers receive multiple warm glows through giving to multiple causes, thus supporting the preference to make multiple small contributions. As a consequence, some scholars suggest an efficiency loss due to high volumes of small donations – which are less efficient to process — rather than fewer large donations. Moral philosopher Peter Singer mentions warm-glow givers in his 2015 book, The Most Good You Can Do. Singer states that these types of donors "give small amounts to many charities [and] are not so interested in whether what they are doing helps others." He references "empathetic concern" and "personal distress" as two distinct components of warm-glow givers.

==== Inefficiency in charitable selection ====
Warm glow may offer an explanation for some of the observed inefficiencies in charitable giving. For example, United States citizens directed more than 60% of their total charitable contributions to religious groups, education institutions, art organizations, and foundations in 2017; compared to under 7% in foreign aid. According to models of social justice and economic QALYs, in which human lives are treated with equal dignity and equal respect - regardless of race, gender, or place of origin - the goal of charity should be to fight global poverty. Similarly, economic models, which attempt to place a monetary value on the human life, highlight the inefficiency of all philanthropy not used to combat global poverty, which offers the highest marginal return. The warm-glow model accounts for such inefficiency because impure altruists may be insensitive to the actual cause, and more sensitive to the act of giving or size of the gift. Thus, warm-glow may generate philanthropic inefficiencies to the extent that it desensitizes potential donors to the marginal impact of a given charity. In response to this concern, William MacAskill and colleagues have advanced a process of philanthropic allocation called "effective altruism". This methodology seeks to leverage logic and responsibility to identify effective charitable opportunities, thus minimizing the effect of warm-glow in the decision-making process.

== Criticisms ==
=== Ad-hoc ===
A common criticism of the warm-glow paradigm is that it seems ad-hoc. Indeed, Andreoni, the father of the original model, stated that "putting warm-glow into the model is, while intuitively appealing, an admittedly ad hoc fix." As the body of research has evolved over nearly 30 years — incorporating philosophical, psychological, and physiological insights – it has become a better descriptive model of behavior.

=== Self-delusion ===
An obscure criticism of the warm-glow paradigm is that it necessitates self-deception. This argument states that in order to reap the emotional reward of helping others, one must believe his actions to be motivated altruistically. Yet, the mere existence of a warm glow should then contradict the belief of pure altruism. A question arises as to whether prolonged self-delusion is sustainable and impervious to learning through self-perception.

== Extensions ==
Some research has investigated the link between warm glow and the phenomenon of mere exposure, leading researchers to consider warm glow as a heuristic.
