= Alan M. Leslie =

Scottish psychologist

- Citizenship: Scottish
- Education: University of Edinburgh; University of Oxford
- Known for: Autism research
- Children: Sarah-Jane Leslie
- Scientific career
- Fields: Psychologist
- Workplaces: Rutgers University
- Thesis: The Representation of Perceived Causal Connection in Infancy (1979)
- Doctoral advisor: Jerome Bruner

Alan Miller Leslie is a Scottish psychologist and Professor of Psychology and Cognitive science at Rutgers University, where he directs the Cognitive Development Laboratory (CDL) and is co-director of the Rutgers University Center for Cognitive Science (RUCCS) along with Ernest Lepore.

== Education ==
Leslie completed his undergraduate degree in Psychology and Linguistics at the University of Edinburgh in 1974 and received his D.Phil. in Experimental Psychology from the University of Oxford in 1979.

== Academic career ==
For a number of years he was a Medical Research Council Senior Scientist at the University of London. He joined the faculty at Rutgers University in 1993. He has also worked as a visiting professor at the Autonomous University of Madrid, the University of Chicago, and the University of California, Los Angeles. In 2005 he gave the XIII Kanizsa Memorial Lecture at the University of Trieste and in 2006 he was the inaugural recipient of the Ann L. Brown Award for Excellence in Developmental Research. In 2008 Dr. Leslie was designated a Fellow of the Association for Psychological Science and he was also elected to the American Academy of Arts and Sciences.

== Research ==
Leslie was a member of the Cognitive Development Unit (CDU) in London who proposed the theory of mind impairment in autism. In 1985 he published with Simon Baron-Cohen and Uta Frith the famous article Does the autistic child have a "theory of mind"?, in which it was suggested that children with autism have particular difficulties with tasks requiring the child to understand another person's beliefs and desires.

He is interested in the design of the cognitive system early in development. He has contributed a number of influential experimental studies and theoretical ideas on the perception of cause and effect, object tracking, and agent detection in infancy, the developmental role of modularity of mind, and the Theory of Mind Mechanism (ToMM) in the development of social cognition and its impairment in autism.

== Family ==
His daughter, Sarah-Jane Leslie, is Dean of Graduate Studies at Princeton University.
