= Department of Psychology (Harvard University) =

School in Cambridge, Massachusetts, US

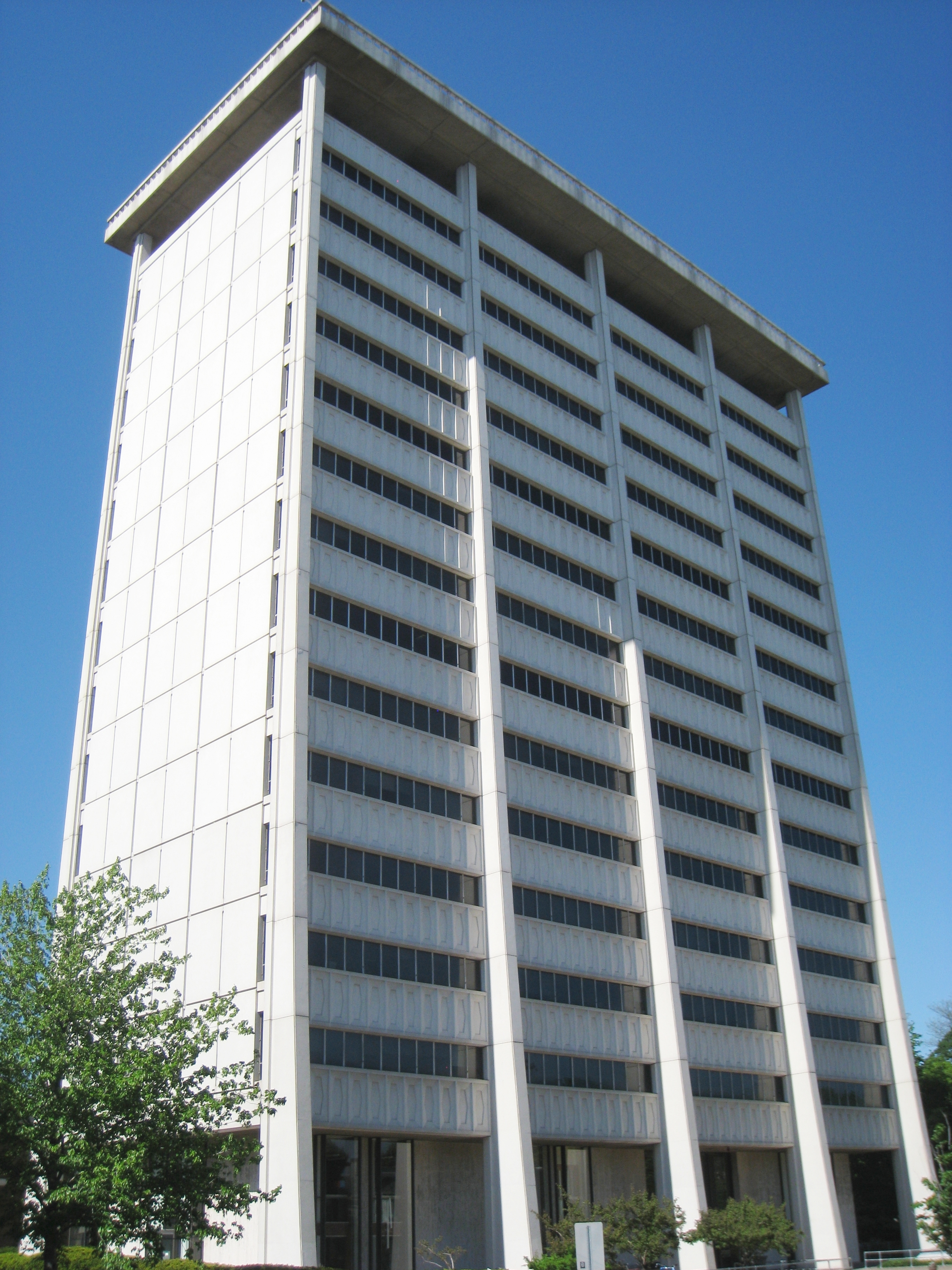
- William James Hall, home to the Departments of Psychology, Sociology and Social studies
- Parent institution: Harvard Faculty of Arts and Sciences
- Chairperson: Matthew K. Nock
- Faculty: approx. 28 full-time faculty members (2023)
- Students: approx. 240 undergraduate students and 70 Ph.D. students
- Location: 33 Kirkland Street, Cambridge, MA, United States
- Website: psychology.fas.harvard.edu

The Department of Psychology is an academic department within the Faculty of Arts and Sciences at Harvard University in Cambridge, Massachusetts, United States.

This department offers Bachelor's, Master's and Doctorate degrees in Psychology. Current research at the department focuses on clinical, cognitive, developmental, and social psychology. Notable psychologists that have been affiliated with the department include William James, B. F. Skinner, Gordon Allport, Jerome Bruner, George Miller, and Henry Murray, among others included.

== History ==
Psychology at Harvard was originally very closely tied to the philosophy department. Philosopher William James introduced concepts of psychology as a new meaning of developing a system to understand education. From 1874 to 1875, James began teaching psychology and formed the first psychology laboratory in America. James continued to lecture on this "new psychology" and formed the book Talks to Teachers on Psychology, considered the first widely accepted psychology textbook. In 1878, G. Stanley Hall, a graduate student of James at Harvard, was the first student to receive a PhD in psychology in the United States. Starting in 1892, Hugo Münsterberg became a professor of psychology and directed the psychological laboratory.

During the early 20th century, Harvard's psychological studies and research were still under the philosophical department. A psychological clinic opened in 1927 under the direction of Morton Prince, who would be followed by Henry A. Murray beginning in 1928. Edwin Boring, with the approval of Harvard President James B. Conant, helped establish a separate psychology department in 1934 that became completely autonomous in 1936. The formation of a department apart from the philosophy program allowed more independent research in psychology and a greater focus on experimental psychology.

When Gordon Allport held the chair of the psychology department, the Faculty of Arts and Sciences allowed for the formation of the Department of Social Relations in 1946, which became an interdisciplinary collaboration among the academic areas of anthropology, sociology and psychology. With this division, the psychology department was left to exclusively conduct experimental research, while the social relations department focused on social, anthropological and clinical research. Training for clinical psychology was discontinued at the psychology department in 1967. The interdisciplinary social relations department began to dissipate with the formation of the Department of Sociology in 1970. Still, in 1972 the Department of Psychology and Social Relations recombined the areas of psychology for a few years. Only in 1986 did psychology become completely independent of sociology, when the psychology department acquired its current name, the Department of Psychology.

== Academics ==
=== Undergraduate ===
Undergraduate students may pursue psychological studies and complete their bachelors in the General, Cognitive Neuroscience, and Evolutionary Psychology or Cognitive Science track. Foundational courses are offered in cognitive neuroscience, social psychology, developmental psychology, Psychopathology, and neurobiology of behavior. Advanced courses include specific topics in psychology, and classes in collaboration with other departments and disciplines. Students may complete a two-semester thesis writing course in their senior year under the supervision of a department faculty.

In 2022, Harvard College awarded 66 bachelor's degrees in psychology, making the subject the third most popular social science concentration after economics and government and tied with social studies. Psychology majors comprised approximately 6.5% of the degrees awarded that year.

=== Graduate ===
Graduate students may complete a Ph.D. in psychology in four different areas: Clinical Science, Social, Developmental, Cognition, Brain, and Behavior (CBB). The department consists of two tracks: clinical science and common curriculum, of which the latter includes Social Psychology, Developmental Psychology, and Cognition, Brain, and Behavior (CBB). Students may only complete a master's degree as part of the research-focused Ph.D. program, which typically lasts four to five years. Graduates may go on to follow an academic career or work in the government, consulting firms, tech companies, social service agencies, or the medical field.

There are currently 69 graduate students who are organized according to different laboratory units (approximately 25) under the supervision of individual professors. The labs with the most Ph.D. students include clinical psychology, affective neuroscience and development, youth mental health, and Computational Cognitive Neuroscience. The department also has 60 postdocs, fellows and research associates. During the 1970s, the psychology department awarded, on average, between 20 and 30 doctorate degrees per year, which decreased to an average of between 10 and 20 degrees per year from the 1980s to the present. The department awarded ten doctorate degrees in 2022.

=== Research ===
Research at the Department of Psychology is divided into four programs:

- Clinical Science
- Cognition, Brain, and Behavior (CBB)
- Developmental Psychology
- Social Psychology

Clinical Science research focuses particularly on severe psychopathology and research in abnormal psychology to further the treatment of mental disorders. Key research areas include various mental health disorders and their symptoms (e. g. emotional and thought disorders, schizophrenia, depression, borderline personality disorder, anxiety disorders, self-harm, and suicide). Research also attempts to evaluate possible contributing factors and predictors of mental health problems, such as stigma against minorities, psychosocial elements, or environmental factors in child development.

Cognition, Brain, and Behavior (CBB) studies the psychology of mental processes (e.g., memory, attention, perception, learning, language, etc.). CBB also addresses social cognition, moral decision-making, aging, and neurological disorders. The research covers human and non-human subjects and relies on functional neuroimaging techniques, online surveys, and computer-based behavioral tests.

In developmental psychology, students and professors at Harvard research early developments of infants and children to gain insight into the human mind and nature. Research areas include knowledge of objects, persons, language, music, space, number, morality, and social categories. Research is conducted by the Laboratory for Developmental Studies.

Social Psychology studies the psychology of individual and group behavior, emotions, and thoughts in social and cultural contexts, social cognition, and modes of social perception and knowledge. The research takes an interdisciplinary approach, incorporating cognitive neuroscience, developmental psychology, and other fields of economics, sociology, business studies, political studies, medicine, and law.

=== Rankings ===
According to the QS World University Rankings by Subject in Psychology, Harvard University placed 1st worldwide from 2020 to 2023, ahead of Stanford University, the University of Oxford, and the University of Cambridge. Based on the National Research Council ranking in the US, Harvard took 6th place among Ph.D. programs and 7th place for undergraduate studies. Times Higher Education World University Rankings in psychology placed Harvard in 5th place in 2023, 4th in 2022 and 2018, 6th in 2021 and 2020, and 7th in 2019. According to US News Reports, Harvard University tied 3rd place with UCLA and the University of Michigan for the Best Psychology Schools of graduate schools in 2022 and behind Stanford University and the University of California, Berkeley.

== Contributions to psychology ==
One of Harvard's most well-known psychologists was B. F. Skinner. Considered the father of behaviorism, Skinner developed a form of radical behaviorism, which claims that environmental stimuli and experiential factors play a significant role in determining behavior through positive and negative reinforcements (rewards and punishments). Skinner's approach attempted to scientifically control the study of behavior rather than analyzing internal mental processes. As part of the experimental analysis of behavior, Skinner invented the operant conditioning chamber to study animal behavior. Skinner's approach influenced the practice of psychology, laboratory applications, and educational and psychotherapeutic applications of behavior. In the Skinnerian tradition, Richard Herrnstein developed the matching law, in which choices are distributed according to rates of reinforcement for making the choices.

The field of personality psychology can be traced back to Harvard psychologist Gordon Allport, who developed values scales and a personality theory based on traits that make up a person's identity. Rejecting psychoanalysis and behaviorism, Allport developed a trait theory that tried to identify patterns of behavior, thought, and emotion and classified traits into Cardinal, Central, and Secondary traits according to their influence on behavior. Allport was influential in conceptualizing other topics, such as rumors, prejudice, discrimination, self-esteem, and religion.

Harvard psychology has played a part in the development of cognitive psychology. George Armitage Miller is considered one of the founders of psycholinguistics and was an important figure in the development of cognitive psychology in reaction to behaviorism in the late 1970s. Miller is known for shifting psychology into the realm of mental processes and merging this new approach with linguistics, computation theory, and information theory. Miller made contributions to the area of working memory, developing the term chunk to explain how individuals deal with limitations of memory and providing an approximation of the limit of working memory in his paper, "The Magical Number Seven, Plus or Minus Two: Some Limits on Our Capacity for Processing Information". Miller also coined Miller's Law: "In order to understand what another person is saying, you must assume it is true and try to imagine what it could be true of." Another Harvard psychologist Jerome Bruner, who was also part of the so-called cognitive revolution, contributed to cognitive learning theory in educational psychology. In recent years, Steven Pinker has been an advocate of the computational theory of mind and evolutionary psychology and has provided evolutionary explanations for the human mind, language, and behavior.

Several Harvard psychologists have contributed to the area of developmental psychology, including research on long-term developments, educational theory, language acquisition, and cognitive psychology. Jerome Bruner conducted much of his research on developmental psychology and educational theory, formulating a theory of cognitive development, which categorized modes of internal representation into enactive (action-based), iconic (image-based), and symbolic (language-based). Bruner is also noted for formulating the spiral curriculum and scaffolding (restricting the freedom in the learning process to make it more manageable). Harvard psychologist Roger Brown is considered the father of developmental psycholinguistics, while Erik Eriksen is known for his theory on the psychological development of humans. More recently, Jerome Kagan was a key pioneer in developmental psychology, focusing his research on temperaments through longitudinal studies. Elizabeth Spelke has developed a theory of core knowledge that infants possess innate cognitive systems or "core knowledge systems" to form new cognitive abilities. Susan Carey has introduced concepts such as fast mapping, extended mapping, Quinan bootstrapping, and folk theorization to explain learning processes in children.

Harvard psychologists have also made contributions to social psychology and positive psychology. In the 20th century, Roger Brown did some of the first research on memory phenomena of the tip of the tongue and flashbulb memory. David McClelland developed the Need theory that explains how needs for achievement, affiliation, and power impact behavior in organizations and managements. While at Harvard, Stanley Milgram conducted the so-called "small-world experiment" to examine the average path lengths for social networks and notably found that human society is a small-world network with short path-lengths. Mahzarin Banaji is noted for having introduced the concept of implicit bias, in which implicit and explicit memories are applied to social constructs. In moral psychology, Joshua Greene was the first to propose the dual process theory, which stipulates that moral judgments contain fast and slow reasoning processes. In positive psychology, Daniel Gilbert has developed the notion of affective forecasting to predict one's affect in the future and fundamental attribution error. Ellen Langer is noted for coining the term illusion of control and is influential in research on aging and mindfulness.

== People ==
=== Alumni ===
The following is a list of notable individuals who completed a degree (AB, AM, or Ph.D.) from Harvard's Department of Psychology.

- G. Stanley Hall (PhD, 1878)
- James Rowland Angell, (AM, 1892)
- Mary W. Calkins (1896) †
- Robert S. Woodworth (AM, 1896)
- Edward Thorndike (AM, 1897)
- Boris Sidis (PhD, 1897)
- Edwin Holt (PhD, 1901)
- Robert Yerkes (PhD, 1902)
- Edward Tolman (PhD, 1915)
- Gardner Murphy (AM, 1917)
- Floyd Henry Allport (PhD, 1919)
- William Moulton Marston (PhD, 1921)
- Gordon Allport (PhD, 1922)
- Leonard Carmichael (PhD, 1924)
- B. F. Skinner (PhD, 1931)
- Muzafer Sherif (AM, 1932)
- Saul Rosenzweig (PhD, 1932)
- Stanley Smith Stevens (PhD, 1933)
- Donald O. Hebb, (PhD, 1936)
- Jerome Bruner (PhD, 1941)
- George Miller (PhD, 1946)
- Robert N. Bellah (AB, 1950)*
- Edgar Schein (PhD, 1952)*
- Edward E. Jones (PhD, 1953)*
- Leon Kamin (PhD, 1954)*
- Richard J. Herrnstein (PhD, 1955)
- Endel Tulving (PhD, 1956)
- Ulric Neisser (AB, PhD, 1956)
- Martin Theodore Orne (AB, PhD, 1958)*
- George Sperling (PhD, 1959)
- Edwin Locke (AB, 1960)*
- Stanley Milgram (PhD, 1960)*
- Carol Gilligan (PhD, 1964)*
- John M. Darley (PhD, 1965)*
- Eleanor Rosch Heider (PhD, 1969)*
- Daniel Goleman (PhD, 1974)
- Susan Carey (PhD, 1975)
- Susan Fiske (PhD, 1978)
- Steven Pinker (PhD, 1979)
- Robert Epstein (PhD, 1981)
- Leda Cosmides (PhD, 1985)

† Mary. W. Calkins completed all the requirements for a Ph.D., but Harvard denied her the degree since she was a woman.

* Individuals completed degrees at the Department of Social Relations.

=== Historic faculty ===
The following is a list of notable past faculty members of the Department of Psychology:

- Gordon Allport
- Solomon Asch
- Edwin Boring
- Roger Brown
- Jerome Bruner
- Raymond Cattell
- Erik Erikson
- William Kaye Estes
- Richard Herrnstein
- William James
- Jerome Kagan
- Lawrence Kohlberg
- Karl Lashley
- Timothy Leary
- Eleanor Maccoby
- David McClelland
- Stanley Milgram
- Walter Mischel
- George Armitage Miller
- Henry Murray

=== Current faculty ===
The following is a list of notable current faculty members of the Department of Psychology.

- George A. Alvarez
- Mahzarin R. Banaji
- Randy Buckner
- Alfonso Caramazza
- Mina Cikara
- Fiery Cushman
- Samuel J. Gershman
- Daniel Gilbert
- Joshua Greene
- Mark Hatzenbuehler
- Jill M. Hooley
- Ellen Langer
- Katie A. McLaughlin
- Richard McNally
- Matthew K. Nock
- Elizabeth A. Phelps
- Steven Pinker
- Daniel Schacter
- Leah Somerville
- Elizabeth Spelke
- John R. Weisz

== See also ==
- Harvard Department of Social Relations
- American Psychological Association
- History of psychology
