= Jeff Stibel =

American businessman

- Born: 1972 or 1973 (age 52–53)
- Education: Tufts University; Brown University; MIT Sloan School of Management
- Occupation: Entrepreneur
- Website: https://web.archive.org/web/20150402153316/http://www.stibel.com/

Jeff Stibel is an entrepreneur, having started numerous technology and marketing companies, and a venture capital investor, as co-founder (with Kobe Bryant) of Bryant Stibel.

At age 32, he became one of the youngest public company CEOs in America and opened the NASDAQ stock market on June 15, 2007. He is also an amateur cognitive scientist, a New York Times bestselling author, and a weekly columnist for the USA Today.

== Business ==
Stibel is a venture capital investor at BryantStibel. He previously was the chairman and CEO of Dun & Bradstreet Credibility Corp until its merger with Dun & Bradstreet. He became Vice Chairman of the merged company after the acquisition.

As an entrepreneur and business executive, Stibel has helped start and grow a number of companies and was listed as one of Business Week's "40 under 40." He was formerly the president and CEO of Web.com (NASDAQ: WWWW) and was previously the CEO of Interland (NASDAQ: INLD). He also serves on the board of directors for Autobytel (NASDAQ: ABTL). He was general manager and Senior Vice President of United Online (NASDAQ: UNTD), which runs ISPs NetZero and Juno, and social networking site Classmates.com. He was the founder and CEO of Applied Cognition Labs, WorldWide MediaWorks (offeroutlet.com), SeaVista Development and Simpli, which is currently owned by ValueClick, (NASDAQ: VCLK). He currently sits on the Board of Directors of Web.com, EdgeCast, Autobytel, ThinMail, The Search Agency and Axon Labs. He also serves on the academic Boards of Brown University’s Entrepreneurship Program and Tufts University’s Leadership Center.

Stibel left graduate school to start Simpli, a search and marketing company that was sold to NetZero in 2001 and again to ValueClick in 2004. He started Simpli with professors from Brown University (James A. Anderson, Steve Reiss), MIT (Dan Ariely) and Princeton University (George A. Miller), as well as entrepreneurs David Landan, Andrew Duchon, Paul Allopenna, Peter Delgrosso and Carl Dunham. He later helped form United Online, a public company that acquired NetZero and Juno in 2001 and later bought Classmates.com and FTD. In 2005, he left United Online to become the CEO of Interland, a public company that was rebranded by Stibel and team as a new company called Web.com.

On August 22, 2016, Kobe Bryant and Stibel launched Bryant-Stibel, a venture capital firm focused on different businesses including media, data, gaming and technology, with $100 million in funding. Starting in 2013, the pair had invested in 15 businesses together.

== Cognitive science ==
As an academic and scientist, Stibel focused most of his academic career on cognitive science. He received degrees in philosophy and psychology as an undergraduate at Tufts University and counts Daniel Dennett as a mentor. He received a degree in cognitive science at Brown University, where he studied under James A. Anderson. He also studied business, marketing and economics under Dan Ariely at MIT Sloan School of Management [reference needed]. He received an honorary PhD in business from Pepperdine University and gave the commencement address in 2015. Stibel has published numerous academic articles in cognitive science, psychology, economics and business,[references needed] and he is a regular contributor to Harvard Business Review.

== Published works ==
1. Stibel (2021). Decreases in Brain Size and Encephalization in Anatomically Modern Humans, Brain, Behavior and Evolution
2. Stibel (2013). Breakpoint Macmillan, London, UK. 2013 New York Times bestseller for non-fiction and science
3. Stibel (2009). Wired for Thought Harvard Business Press, Cambridge, MA. Wikipedia: Wired for Thought
4. Stibel, with Ben-Zeev, & Dror (2009). The Collapsing Choice Theory: Dissociating Choice and Judgment in Decision Making, Theory & Decision, Vol. 66.
5. Stibel, with Kaplan, Norton, Friedman, Krishnamurthy, Erickson, and Delgrosso (2008). Unconventional Wisdom in a Downturn, Harvard Business Review, Vol. 86, No. 12.
6. Stibel (2007). Discounting Do’s and Don’ts, MIT Sloan Management Review, Vol. 49, No. 1.
7. Stibel (2006). The Role of Explanation in Categorization Decisions, International Journal of Psychology, 41.2.
8. Stibel (2006). Categorization and Technology Innovation, in Harnad & Dror, Distributed Cognition, John Benjamins. (Book Chapter)
9. Stibel (2005). Mental Models and Online Consumer Behavior, Behavior & Information Technology, 24.
10. Stibel (2005). Increasing Productivity through Framing Effects for Interactive Consumer Choice, Cognition, Technology & Work, 7.1.
11. Stibel, with Slovak, Over & Sloman (2003). Frequency Illusions and Other Fallacies, Organizational Behavior and Human Decision Processes, 91.
12. Stibel, with Ben-Zeev, Sloman & Dennis (2000). Choice and Judgment in Decision Making: Working Memory Demands Mediate the Monty Hall Dilemma, Psychonomics.
13. Stibel (2000). Should I quit my job and start a company—Yes!, Associated Press.
1. Stibel, with Hadjichristidis, Over, Stevenson & Sloman (1999). Opening Pandora's Box: Selective Unpacking and Superadditivity, ECCS, 265–270.
2. Stibel (1995). The Effects of Associativity, Interconnectivity and Generation on Memory, Copyrighted Thesis, Dissertation Abstracts International, Call number: 39090010918650b.
