= Simpli =

Early search engine that offered word-sense disambiguation to search terms

- Defunct: 2001
- Fate: Merged with Search123
- Key people: George A. Miller (advisory board member)
- Parent: NetZero (2000–2001)

Simpli was an early search engine that offered word-sense disambiguation to search terms. A user could enter in a search term that was ambiguous (e.g., Java) and the search engine would return a list of alternatives (coffee, programming language, island in the South Seas).

The technology was rooted in brain science and built by academics to model the way in which the mind stored and utilized language. The early technology was derived heavily from WordNet, which was invented by George A. Miller at Princeton University. George Miller was an advisory Board member to Simpli.

Simpli was founded by a number of graduate students, post-doctoral fellows, and professors meeting in the Department of Cognitive and Linguistic Sciences at Brown University. Graduate students included the CEO Jeff Stibel, David Landan, and John Santini. Post-docs included Andrew Duchon and Paul Allopenna. Professors included James A. Anderson and Steve Reiss from Brown University, Dan Ariely from the MIT Sloan School of Management and George Miller from Princeton.

Simpli was sold in 2000 to NetZero. Another company that leveraged the Simpli WordNet technology was purchased by Google and they continue to use the technology for search and advertising under the brand Google AdSense.

In 2001, there was a buyout of the company and it was merged with another company called Search123. Most of the original members joined the new company. That company was later sold in 2004 to ValueClick, which continues to use the technology and search engine to this day.

== See also ==
- Online advertising
- Search Engines
