= Cognitive psychology =

Subdiscipline of psychology

Cognitive psychology is the scientific study of human mental processes such as attention, language use, memory, perception, problem solving, creativity, and reasoning. It deals with the perception of information, understanding, thoughts, and formulation and production of answers. Cognitive psychology originated in the 1960s in a break from behaviorism, which held from the 1920s to 1950s that unobservable mental processes were outside the realm of empirical science. This break came as researchers in linguistics, cybernetics, and applied psychology used models of mental processing to explain human behavior. Work derived from cognitive psychology was integrated into other branches of psychology and into various other modern disciplines, such as cognitive science, linguistics, and economics.

== History ==
Philosophical discussions about the human mind and behavior, as well as their processes, date back to the ancient Greeks. In 387 BCE, Plato suggested that the brain was the seat of mental processes. In 1637, René Descartes posited that humans have innate ideas and promulgated mind-body dualism, which came to be known as substance dualism (essentially the idea that the mind and the body are two separate substances). From that time, major debates ensued through the 19th century about whether human thought is solely experiential (empiricism) or includes innate knowledge (nativism). Some of those involved in this debate include George Berkeley and John Locke on the side of empiricism, and Immanuel Kant on the side of nativism.

With the philosophical debate continuing, the mid- to late 19th century was a critical time in the development of psychology as a scientific discipline. Two discoveries that later played substantial roles in cognitive psychology were Paul Broca's discovery of the area of the brain largely responsible for language production and Carl Wernicke's discovery of an area thought to be mostly responsible for comprehension of language. Both areas were subsequently formally named for their founders, and disruptions of an individual's language production or comprehension due to trauma or malformation in these areas have come to commonly be known as Broca's aphasia and Wernicke's aphasia.

From the 1920s to the 1950s, the main approach to psychology was behaviorism. Initially, its adherents viewed mental events such as thoughts, ideas, attention, and consciousness as unobservable and thus outside the realm of psychology as a science. A pioneer of cognitive psychology, whose work predated much of the behaviorist literature, was Carl Jung. Jung introduced the hypothesis of cognitive functions in his 1921 book Psychological Types. Another pioneer of cognitive psychology, who worked outside the boundaries (both intellectual and geographical) of behaviorism, was Jean Piaget. From 1926 to the 1950s and into the 1980s, he studied the thoughts, language, and intelligence of children and adults.

In the mid-20th century, four main influences arose that inspired and shaped cognitive psychology as a formal school of thought:

- With the development of new warfare technology during World War II came a need for a greater understanding of human performance. Problems such as how best to train soldiers to use new technology and how to handle matters of attention under duress became important to military personnel. Behaviorism provided little if any insight into these matters, and the work of Donald Broadbent, integrating concepts from human performance research and the recently developed information theory, forged the way in this area.
- Developments in computer science led to parallels being drawn between human thought and the computational functionality of computers, opening entirely new areas of psychological thought. Allen Newell and Herbert Simon spent years developing the concept of artificial intelligence (AI) and later collaborated with cognitive psychologists to explore its implications. This encouraged a concept of mental functions patterned on the way computers handle memory storage and retrieval, and it opened an important doorway for cognitivism.
- Noam Chomsky's 1959 critique of behaviorism, and empiricism more generally, initiated what came to be known as the "cognitive revolution". Within psychology, in response to behaviorism, J. S. Bruner, J. J. Goodnow & G. A. Austin wrote "A Study of Thinking" in 1956. In 1960, G. A. Miller, E. Galanter, and K. Pribram wrote "Plans and the Structure of Behavior". The same year, Bruner and Miller founded the Harvard Center for Cognitive Studies, which institutionalized the revolution and launched the field of cognitive science.
- Formal recognition of the field involved the establishment of research institutions such as George Mandler's Center for Human Information Processing in 1964. Mandler described the origins of cognitive psychology in a 2002 article in the Journal of the History of the Behavioral Sciences.

Ulric Neisser put the term "cognitive psychology" into common use through his 1967 book Cognitive Psychology. Neisser's definition of "cognition" illustrates the then-progressive concept of cognitive processes:

The term "cognition" refers to all processes by which the sensory input is transformed, reduced, elaborated, stored, recovered, and used. It is concerned with these processes even when they operate in the absence of relevant stimulation, as in images and hallucinations. ... Given such a sweeping definition, it is apparent that cognition is involved in everything a human being might possibly do; that every psychological phenomenon is a cognitive phenomenon. But although cognitive psychology is concerned with all human activity rather than some fraction of it, the concern is from a particular point of view. Other viewpoints are equally legitimate and necessary. Dynamic psychology, which begins with motives rather than with sensory input, is a case in point. Instead of asking how a man's actions and experiences result from what he saw, remembered, or believed, the dynamic psychologist asks how they follow from the subject's goals, needs, or instincts.

== Cognitive processes ==
The main focus of cognitive psychologists is the mental processes that affect behavior. Those processes include, but are not limited to, the following three stages of memory:

1. Sensory memory storage: holds sensory information
2. Short-term memory storage: holds information temporarily for analysis and retrieves information from the long-term memory.
3. Long-term memory: holds information over an extended period of time, which receives information from the short-term memory.

=== Attention ===
The psychological definition of attention is "a state of focused awareness on a subset of the available sensation perception information". It refers to a mental process that selects out important information from the world around us through our five senses, that helps the brain to not get overloaded with the vivid amount of information available to us. A key function of attention is to identify irrelevant data and filter it out, enabling significant data to be distributed to the other mental processes. For example, the human brain may simultaneously receive auditory, visual, olfactory, taste, and tactile information. The brain can consciously handle only a small subset of this information, and this is accomplished through the attentional processes.

Attention can be divided into two major attentional systems: exogenous control and endogenous control. Exogenous control works in a bottom-up manner and is responsible for orienting reflex, and pop-out effects. Endogenous control works top-down and is the more deliberate attentional system, responsible for divided attention and conscious processing.

One major focal point relating to attention within the field of cognitive psychology is the concept of divided attention. Some early studies examined the ability of a person wearing headphones to discern a meaningful conversation when presented with different messages in each ear; this is known as the dichotic listening task. Key findings involved an increased understanding of the mind's ability to both focus on one message, while still being somewhat aware of information being taken in from the ear, not being consciously attended to. For example, participants (wearing earphones) may be told that they will hear separate messages in each ear and are expected to attend only to information related to basketball. When the experiment starts, the basketball message will be presented to the left ear, and irrelevant information to the right ear. At some point, the basketball-related message will shift to the right ear, and the irrelevant information to the left ear. When this happens, the listener is usually able to repeat the entire message at the end, having attended to the left or right ear only when it was appropriate. The ability to attend to one conversation in the face of many is known as the cocktail party effect.

Other major findings include that participants cannot comprehend both passages when shadowing one, cannot report the content of the unattended message, and shadow a message better when the pitches in each ear differ. However, while deep processing does not occur, early sensory processing does. Subjects did notice if the pitch of the unattended message changed or if it ceased altogether, and some even oriented to the unattended message if their name was mentioned.

=== Memory ===
The two main types of memory are short-term memory and long-term memory; however, short-term memory has become better understood as working memory, a temporary storage of new and previously learned information.

==== Working memory ====
Though working memory is often thought of as a more accurate depiction of short-term memory, it additionally encompasses the ability to process, maintain, and manipulate temporary information across a wide range of everyday activities, even in the face of distraction. Working memory is time-limited (temporary) and capacity-limited. George Miller introduced the idea that humans can hold 7 plus or minus 2 items in working memory at a time, though Nelson Cowan's 4 plus or minus 1 may be more accurate.

One early influential experiment from Ebbinghaus, provided evidence suggesting the nature of forgetting. After attempting to recall several strings of letters (in German) for consecutive days, he posited a forgetting curve. Relevant to working memory, his results indicated a steep decay in memory after only 20 minutes, providing evidence for a separate short-term store.

The Working Memory Model (Baddeley and Hitch, 1974, updated-2000)

To account for some gaps in Atkinson and Shiffrin's Modal Model of memory, Alan Baddeley and Graham Hitched proposed a novel working memory model. It takes into account both visual and auditory stimuli, long-term memory as a reference, and a central processor that combines and interprets them.

A large part of memory is forgetting, and there is a large debate among psychologists of decay theory versus interference theory, though current trends provide more evidence to support an interference account.

==== Long-term memory ====
Modern conceptions of memory usually focus on long-term memory and break it down into three main sub-classes.

- Procedural memory is memory for the performance of particular types of action. It is often activated at the subconscious level, or, at most, requires only a minimal amount of conscious effort. Procedural memory includes stimulus-response-type information, which is activated through association with particular tasks, routines, etc. A person is using procedural knowledge when they seemingly "automatically" respond in a particular manner to a particular situation or process. An example is driving a car.
- Semantic memory is the factual knowledge that a person possesses. Knowledge like what the Eiffel Tower looks like, or the name of a friend from sixth grade, represents semantic memory. Access to semantic memory ranges from slightly to extremely effortful, depending on many variables, including, but not limited to, the recency of encoding, the number of associations it has with other information, the frequency of access, and the level of processing (how deeply it was processed when it was encoded).
- Episodic memory is the memory of autobiographical events that can be explicitly stated, sometimes described as mental time-travel. It contains all memories such as when one last brushed one's teeth or where one was when one heard about a major news event. Episodic memory typically requires the deepest level of conscious thought, as it often pulls together semantic memory and temporal information to formulate the entire memory.

=== Perception ===
Perception involves both the physical senses (sight, smell, hearing, taste, touch, and proprioception) and the cognitive processes involved in interpreting those senses. Perception influences how people come to understand the world around them through interpreting sensory stimuli. Early psychologists like Edward B. Titchener began to work with perception in their structuralist approach to psychology. Structuralism focused heavily on reducing human thought (or "consciousness", as Titchener would have called it) to its most basic elements by understanding how an individual perceives particular stimuli.

Current perspectives on perception within cognitive psychology tend to focus on specific ways the human mind interprets sensory stimuli and how these interpretations affect behavior. An example of the way in which modern psychologists approach the study of perception is the research being done at the Center for Ecological Study of Perception and Action at the University of Connecticut (CESPA). One study at CESPA concerns ways in which individuals perceive their physical environment and how that influences their navigation through that environment.

=== Language ===
Psychologists have been interested in the cognitive processes involved in language since the 1870s, when Carl Wernicke proposed a model of language processing. Current work on language within the field of cognitive psychology varies widely. Cognitive psychologists may study language acquisition, individual components of language formation (like phonemes), how language use is involved in mood, or numerous other related areas.

Broca's and Wernicke's areas of the brain, which are critical in language

Significant work has focused on understanding the timing of language acquisition and how this timing can be used to determine whether a child has a learning disability or is at risk of developing one. A 2012 study showed that while this can be an effective strategy, it is important for evaluators to include all relevant information in their assessments. Factors such as individual variability, socioeconomic status, short-term memory, long-term memory capacity, and others must be accounted for to ensure valid assessments.

=== Metacognition ===
Metacognition, in a broad sense, is the thoughts that a person has about their own thoughts. More specifically, metacognition includes things like:

- How effective a person is at monitoring their own performance on a given task (self-regulation).
- A person's understanding of their capabilities on particular mental tasks.
- The ability to apply cognitive strategies.

Much of the current research on metacognition in cognitive psychology focuses on its application in education. Increasing a student's metacognitive abilities has been shown to impact their learning and study habits significantly. One key aspect of this concept is the improvement of students' ability to set goals and self-regulate effectively to meet those goals. As part of this process, it is also important to ensure that students are realistically evaluating their level of knowledge and setting achievable goals (another metacognitive task).

Common phenomena related to metacognition include:

- Déjà Vu: feeling of a repeated experience.
- Cryptomnesia: generating thought believing it is unique, but it is actually a memory of an experience; also known as unconscious plagiarism.
- False Fame Effect: non-famous names can be made to be famous.
- Validity effect: statements seem more valid upon repeated exposure.
- Imagination inflation: imagining an event that did not occur and having increased confidence that it did occur.

== Modern perspectives ==
Some modern perspectives on cognitive psychology address cognition as a dual process theory, expounded upon by Daniel Kahneman in 2011. Kahneman differentiated the two styles of processing more, calling them intuition and reasoning. Intuition (or system 1), similar to associative reasoning, was determined to be fast and automatic, usually with strong emotional bonds included in the reasoning process. Kahneman posited that this kind of reasoning was based on formed habits and very difficult to change or manipulate. Reasoning (or system 2) was slower and much more volatile, being subject to conscious judgments and attitudes. Cognitive psychologists have attributed a dual process theory to recognition memory, but most research specifying such a process revolve around reasoning and decision making. Not all cognitive psychologists conduct research under the assumption of dual processes.

== Applications to Other Psychological Fields ==
=== Abnormal psychology ===
Following the cognitive revolution and many of the principal discoveries in cognitive psychology, the discipline of cognitive behavior therapy (CBT) evolved. Aaron T. Beck is generally regarded as the father of cognitive therapy, a particular type of CBT treatment. His work in the areas of recognition and treatment of depression has gained worldwide recognition. In his 1987 book titled Cognitive Therapy of Depression, Beck puts forth three salient points about his reasoning for the treatment of depression by means of therapy-only or therapy and antidepressants versus using a pharmacological-only approach:

1. Despite the prevalent use of antidepressants, the fact remains that not all patients respond to them. Beck cites (in 1987) that only 60 to 65% of patients respond to antidepressants, and recent meta-analyses (a statistical breakdown of multiple studies) show very similar numbers.
2. Many of those who do respond to antidepressants end up not taking their medications, for various reasons. They may develop side effects or have some form of personal objection to taking the drugs.
3. Beck posits that the use of psychotropic drugs may lead to an eventual breakdown in the individual's coping mechanisms. His theory is that the person essentially becomes reliant on the medication as a means of improving mood and fails to practice those coping techniques typically practiced by healthy individuals to alleviate the effects of depressive symptoms. By failing to do so, once the patient is weaned off the antidepressants, they often are unable to cope with normal levels of depressed mood and feel driven to reinstate use of the antidepressants.

=== Social psychology ===
Many facets of modern social psychology have roots in research done within the field of cognitive psychology. Social cognition is a specific sub-set of social psychology that concentrates on processes that have been of particular focus within cognitive psychology, specifically applied to human interactions. Gordon B. Moskowitz defines social cognition as "... the study of the mental processes involved in perceiving, attending to, remembering, thinking about, and making sense of the people in our social world".

The development of multiple social information processing (SIP) models has been influential in studies involving aggressive and antisocial behavior. Kenneth Dodge's SIP model is one of the most, if not the most, empirically supported models of aggression. In his research, Dodge posits that children who are better able to process social information more often display higher levels of socially acceptable behavior, and that the type of social interaction children have affects their relationships. His model asserts that there are five steps that an individual proceeds through when evaluating interactions with other individuals and that how the person interprets cues is key to their reactionary process.

=== Developmental psychology ===
Many prominent figures in developmental psychology base their understanding of development on cognitive models. One of the major paradigms in developmental psychology, the Theory of Mind (ToM), concerns an individual's ability to understand and attribute mental states to others. This concept typically becomes fully apparent in children between the ages of 4 and 6. Essentially, before the child develops ToM, they are unable to understand that those around them can have different thoughts, ideas, or feelings from their own. The development of ToM is a matter of metacognition, or thinking about one's thoughts. The child must be able to recognize that they have their own thoughts and, in turn, that others possess thoughts of their own.

One of the foremost minds in developmental psychology, Jean Piaget, focused much of his attention on cognitive development from birth through adulthood. Though there have been considerable challenges to parts of his stages of cognitive development, they remain a staple in the realm of education. Piaget's concepts and ideas predated the cognitive revolution but inspired a wealth of research in cognitive psychology, and many of his principles have been integrated into modern theory, shaping the predominant views of today.

=== Educational psychology ===
Modern theories of education have drawn on many concepts that are focal points in cognitive psychology. Some of the most prominent concepts include:

- Metacognition: Metacognition is a broad concept encompassing all manners of one's thoughts and knowledge about their own thinking. A key area of educational focus in this realm is self-monitoring, which is closely tied to how well students can assess their knowledge and apply strategies to improve it in areas where they lack it.
- Declarative knowledge and procedural knowledge: Declarative knowledge is a person's 'encyclopedic' knowledge base, whereas procedural knowledge is specific knowledge relating to performing particular tasks. The application of these cognitive paradigms in education aims to enhance students' ability to integrate declarative knowledge into newly learned procedures, thereby facilitating accelerated learning.
- Knowledge organization: Applications of cognitive psychology's understanding of how knowledge is organized in the brain have been a major focus within the field of education in recent years. The hierarchical method of organizing information and how that maps well onto the brain's memory are concepts that have proven extremely beneficial in classrooms.

=== Personality psychology ===
Cognitive therapeutic approaches have received considerable attention in the treatment of personality disorders in recent years. The approach focuses on the formation of what it considers faulty schemata, centered on judgmental biases and general cognitive errors.

== Relationship to cognitive science ==
Cognitive psychology is considered a core aspect of cognitive science, the interdisciplinary study of the mind and mental functions, including how these functions are implemented in brains and machines. Cognitive science, as a unitary field, integrates knowledge, theory, and methodology from psychology, neuroscience, linguistics, philosophy, artificial intelligence, and anthropology.

It has been argued that cognitive science has been largely consumed by cognitive psychology, with some scholars even using the terms interchangeably (see LeMoult & Gotlib, 2019 for an example). This largely results from early difficulties in integrating the different fields of cognitive science (e.g., psychology and artificial intelligence), with the resulting divergence in terminology, methodology, and theoretical approaches over time rendering efforts to cohere the disciplines challenging.

== Criticisms ==
=== Lack of cohesion ===
Some observers have suggested that as cognitive psychology grew during the 1970s, the intricacies of the phenomena and processes it examined led to a loss of cohesion as a field. In Psychology: Pythagoras to Present, for example, John Malone writes: "Examinations of late twentieth-century textbooks dealing with 'cognitive psychology', 'human cognition', 'cognitive science' and the like quickly reveal that there are many, many varieties of cognitive psychology and very little agreement about exactly what may be its domain." This misfortune produced competing models that questioned information-processing approaches to cognitive functioning, such as Decision Making and Behavioral Sciences.

=== Exclusive focus on the mind ===
Recently, cognitive psychology has been criticised for being overly focused on the internal mind and for failing to account for external influences. 4E cognition is one such new approach that aims to show that cognition is embodied, embedded, extended, and enacted.

== Controversies ==
In the early years of cognitive psychology, behaviorist critics held that the empiricism it pursued was incompatible with the concept of internal mental states. However, cognitive neuroscience continues to gather evidence of direct correlations between physiological brain activity and mental states, endorsing the basis for cognitive psychology.

There is, however, disagreement between neuropsychologists and cognitive psychologists. Cognitive psychology has produced models of cognition that are not supported by modern brain science. It is often the case that advocates of different cognitive models form a dialectic relationship with one another, thereby influencing empirical research, with researchers siding with their favorite theory. For example, advocates of mental model theory have sought evidence that deductive reasoning is based on image thinking. In contrast, advocates of mental logic theory have argued that it is based on verbal thinking, leading to a disorderly picture of findings from brain imaging and brain lesion studies. When theoretical claims are set aside, the evidence shows that interaction depends on the type of task tested, whether visuospatial or linguistic in orientation, but that there is also an aspect of reasoning that is not covered by either theory.

Similarly, neurolinguistics has found that interpreting brain imaging studies is easier when theories are set aside. In the field of language cognition research, generative grammar has taken the position that language resides within its private cognitive module, while 'Cognitive Linguistics' goes to the opposite extreme by claiming that language is not an independent function, but operates on general cognitive capacities such as visual processing and motor skills. Consensus in neuropsychology, however, takes the middle position that, while language is a specialized function, it overlaps or interacts with visual processing. Nonetheless, much of the research in language cognition continues to be divided along the lines of generative grammar and Cognitive Linguistics; and this, again, affects adjacent research fields including language development and language acquisition.

== Major research areas ==
Categorization

- Induction and acquisition
- Judgement and classification
- Representation and structure
- Similarity

Knowledge representation

- Dual-coding theories
- Media psychology
- Mental imagery
- Numerical cognition
- Propositional encoding

Language

- Language acquisition
- Language processing
  - Linguistics
  - Grammar
  - Phonetics
  - Phonology

Memory

- Aging and memory
- Autobiographical memory
- Childhood memory
- Constructive memory
- Emotion and memory
- Episodic memory
- Eyewitness memory
- False memories
- Flashbulb memory
- List of memory biases
- Long-term memory
- Semantic memory
- Short-term memory
- Source-monitoring error
- Spaced repetition
- Working memory

Perception

- Attention
- Pattern recognition
- Visual perception
  - Form perception
  - Object recognition
- Event perception
- Psychophysics
- Time sensation

Thinking

- Choice (Glasser's theory)
- Concept formation
- Decision-making
- Logic
- Psychology of reasoning
- Problem solving
- Executive functions

== Influential cognitive psychologists ==
- John R. Anderson
- Alan Baddeley
- David Ausubel
- Albert Bandura
- Frederic Bartlett
- Elizabeth Bates
- Aaron T. Beck
- Robert Bjork
- Paul Bloom
- Gordon H. Bower
- Donald Broadbent
- Jerome Bruner
- Susan Carey
- Noam Chomsky
- Fergus Craik
- Antonio Damasio
- Hermann Ebbinghaus
- Albert Ellis
- K. Anders Ericsson
- William Estes
- Eugene Galanter
- Vittorio Gallese
- Michael Gazzaniga
- Dedre Gentner
- Vittorio Guidano
- Philip Johnson-Laird
- Daniel Kahneman
- Nancy Kanwisher
- Eric Lenneberg
- Alan Leslie
- Willem Levelt
- Elizabeth Loftus
- Alexander Luria
- Brian MacWhinney
- George Mandler
- Jean Matter Mandler
- Ellen Markman
- James McClelland
- George Armitage Miller
- Ulrich Neisser
- Allen Newell
- Allan Paivio
- Seymour Papert
- Jean Piaget
- Steven Pinker
- Michael Posner
- Karl H. Pribram
- Giacomo Rizzolatti
- Henry L. Roediger III
- Eleanor Rosch
- David Rumelhart
- Eleanor Saffran
- Daniel Schacter
- Otto Selz
- Roger Shepard
- Richard Shiffrin
- Herbert A. Simon
- George Sperling
- Robert Sternberg
- Larry Squire
- Saul Sternberg
- Anne Treisman
- Endel Tulving
- Amos Tversky
- Lev Vygotsky

== See also ==
- Cognition
  - Cognitive bias
  - biology
  - description
  - development
  - interventions
  - module
  - neuropsychology
  - poetics
  - robotics
- Connectionism
- Discursive psychology
- Ecological psychology
- Evolutionary psychology
- Fuzzy-trace theory
- Genetic epistemology
- Information processing (psychology)
- Intelligent system
- Intertrial priming
- Models of abnormality
- Neurocognitive
- Perceptual control theory
- Personal information management
- Psychological adaptation
- Rubicon model (psychology)
- Situated cognition
- Social cognition
- Water-level task
