= James A. Anderson (cognitive scientist) =

US professor of Cognitive Science and Brain Science

James (Jim) A. Anderson (born 1940 in Detroit, Michigan) is a Professor of Cognitive Science and Brain Science at Brown University. His multi-disciplinary background includes expertise in psychology, biology, physics, neuroscience and computer science. Anderson received his BS in physics in 1962 Ph.D. in physiology from MIT in 1967.His time teaching at brown started in 1973.

Anderson's research on applications of neural networks have been instrumental to the field of cognitive science as well as numerous business applications. His neural networks have been applied to models of human concept formation, decision making, speech perception, and models of vision.

== Business ==
Anderson's work has spawned numerous companies. Most notably, Anderson was one of the founders of Simpli, which is now owned by ValueClick. Anderson, along with Andrew Duchon, Jeff Stibel, Steve P. Reiss, George A. Miller, Paul Allopenna, John Santini, Carl Dunham, and a number of other Brown University colleagues, created a search engine based on the work of Miller's WordNet and Anderson's neural networks. The science was applied broadly to numerous technology and business applications, most notably Internet search and advertising. Anderson's neural networks were used to spread across a WordNet knowledgebase and disambiguate ambiguous search terms. As an example, the neural networks would take user input, such as a search keyword (Java), disambiguate the term (Java, in the sense of Coffee) and then expand the search term to create a more complete weighted search function (i.e., Java, coffee, Joe, starbucks).

== Sample publications ==
1. Anderson, J. A. and Rosenfeld, E. (1998), Talking Nets: An Oral History of Neural Network Research. Cambridge, MA: MIT Press, 1998, Paperback edition, 2000.
2. Anderson, J. A. (1995), An Introduction to Neural Networks, Cambridge, MA: MIT Press.
3. Anderson, J. A., Spoehr, K. T. and Bennett, D.J. (1994), A study in numerical perversity: Teaching arithmetic to a neural network, Neural Networks for Knowledge Representation and Inference, D.S. Levine and M. Aparicio (Eds.), Hillsdale, NJ: Erlbaum.
4. Anderson, J. A. (1993), The BSB Model: A simple nonlinear autoassociative neural network, M. Hassoun (Ed.), Associative Neural Memories, New York, NY: Oxford U. Press.
5. Anderson, J.A., Pellionisz, A. and Rosenfeld, E. (Eds.)(1990), Neurocomputing 2: Directions for Research. Cambridge, MA: MIT Press, 1990.
6. Anderson, J.A. and Rosenfeld, E. (Eds.)(1988), Neurocomputing: Foundations of Research. Cambridge, MIT Press, 1988.
7. Anderson, J.A. and Hinton, G.E. (1981), Parallel Models for Associative Memory, Hillsdale, New Jersey: Erlbaum Associates, 1981. Revised Edition, 1989.
