= Zeo, Inc. =

Sleep product company (2003–2013)

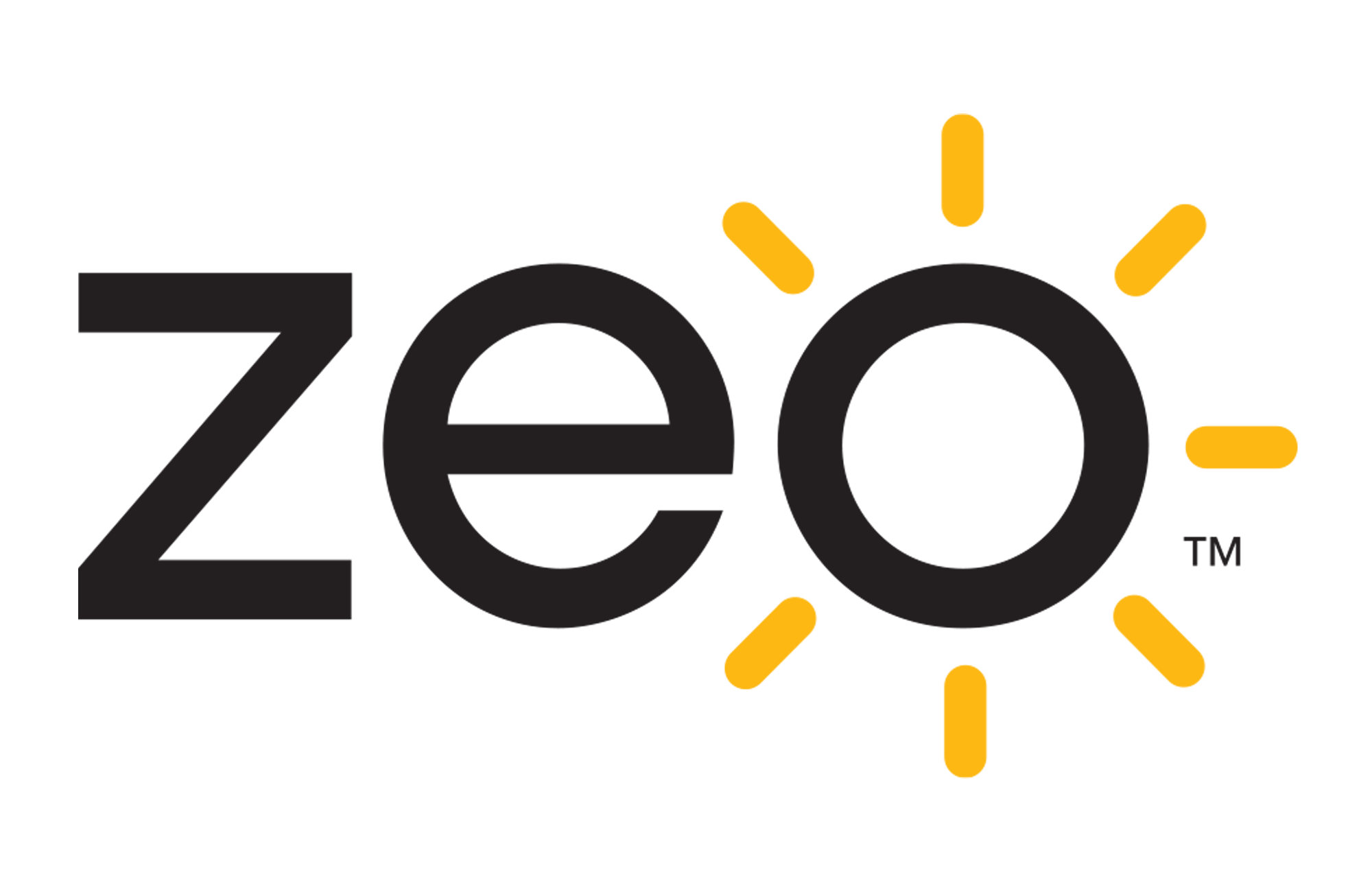
- Company type: Private
- Founded: December 2003
- Headquarters: Boston, Massachusetts, USA
- Key people: David P. Dickinson, CEO; Eric Shashoua, VP Global Business Development; Jason Donahue, VP Global Product Director; Ben Rubin, CTO, VP Development; John Shambroom, VP Research, Engineering and Operations; Daniel Rothman, Founder and Director of R&D

Zeo, Inc., formerly Axon Labs, was a private company founded by Brown University students, established December 29, 2003 in Providence, Rhode Island and later headquartered in Boston, Massachusetts.

== Founding ==
The founders and board members include Daniel Rothman, Ben Rubin, Eric Shashoua, Jason Donahue, Terri Alpert from Stony Creek Brands, David Barone from Sleep Labs, Inc. and Jeff Stibel from Web.com.

== Products ==
Zeo Inc. developed a smart alarm clock with sleep monitor (e.g., REM). Sleep states could be used to sound a wake-up alarm only when the sleeper was in the light stages of sleep, likely to awake more refreshed. Details of sleep could be uploaded to the MyZeo Web site, where they were stored, with detailed historical charts of sleep patterns downloadable, and email suggestion on improving sleep could be sent. The state of sleep was detected by a headband, essentially comprising three long-lasting electrodes made of electrically conductive fabric and a wireless unit, that transmitted data to a Zeo bedside clock unit or Apple iPhone which displayed data and sounded the wake alarm. The company also developed and marketed a personal sleep coaching Web service which allowed users of the clock to upload their sleep data, then measure and analyze their sleep patterns; this was later made available without charge.

== Closure ==
By late 2012 the company was apparently in financial trouble, and it closed down in early 2013, although this was not officially reported at the time. The Web site initially became inaccessible and the Zeo Community Forum became 'currently unavailable and down for maintenance'. By May 2013 the content of the MyZeo website had been removed and the URL was for sale.

=== Effect on users ===
Although the services provided by the MyZeo Web site and emails have stopped, functions that do not rely on the web site or Zeo's support staff are still functional. These include: sleep-state-dependent functionality, the intelligent alarm, displaying information on the last night's sleep (time to fall asleep, time awake, time in light, REM, and deep sleep and producing graphs of sleep states as function of time. The proprietary headband, which was recommend to be replaced about every three months, is no longer available from Zeo, Inc.

At least some of the assets were acquired by ResMed in Ireland, widely known for their CPAP machines. For users determined to continue to get use out of their units, there are ways of keeping them working. Detailed plans on making Zeo-compatible replacement headband sensors were published and widely reported. Users had reported before the company closed that disposable adhesive gel ECG electrodes with offset press-stud connections worked successfully, better than the Zeo headband. Software and procedures were made available to store sleep data without the encryption used by Zeo, and to display historical sleep data, a service previously available only by uploading data to the MyZeo Web site. Some software which had been available from Zeo to developers, while no longer available from the discontinued Zeo Web site or the Wayback Machine, was circulated; for example a data decoder library. During the company's existence ZeoScope software using the decoder library, which allowed the Zeo to be used as a biofeedback device with EEG display and functionality related to lucid dreaming, had been written by an independent developer and distributed without charge under the Apache licence; it did not use facilities of the Zeo Web site, and continued to work after the company closed.

== See also ==
- Quantified Self
