= Cognitive description =

Term in psychology

Cognitive description is a term used in psychology to describe the cognitive workings of the human mind.

A cognitive description specifies what information is utilized during a cognitive action, how this information is processed and transformed, what data structures are used, and what behaviour is generated.

== See also ==
- Cognitive module
