= Conductive textile =

Fabric which can conduct electricity

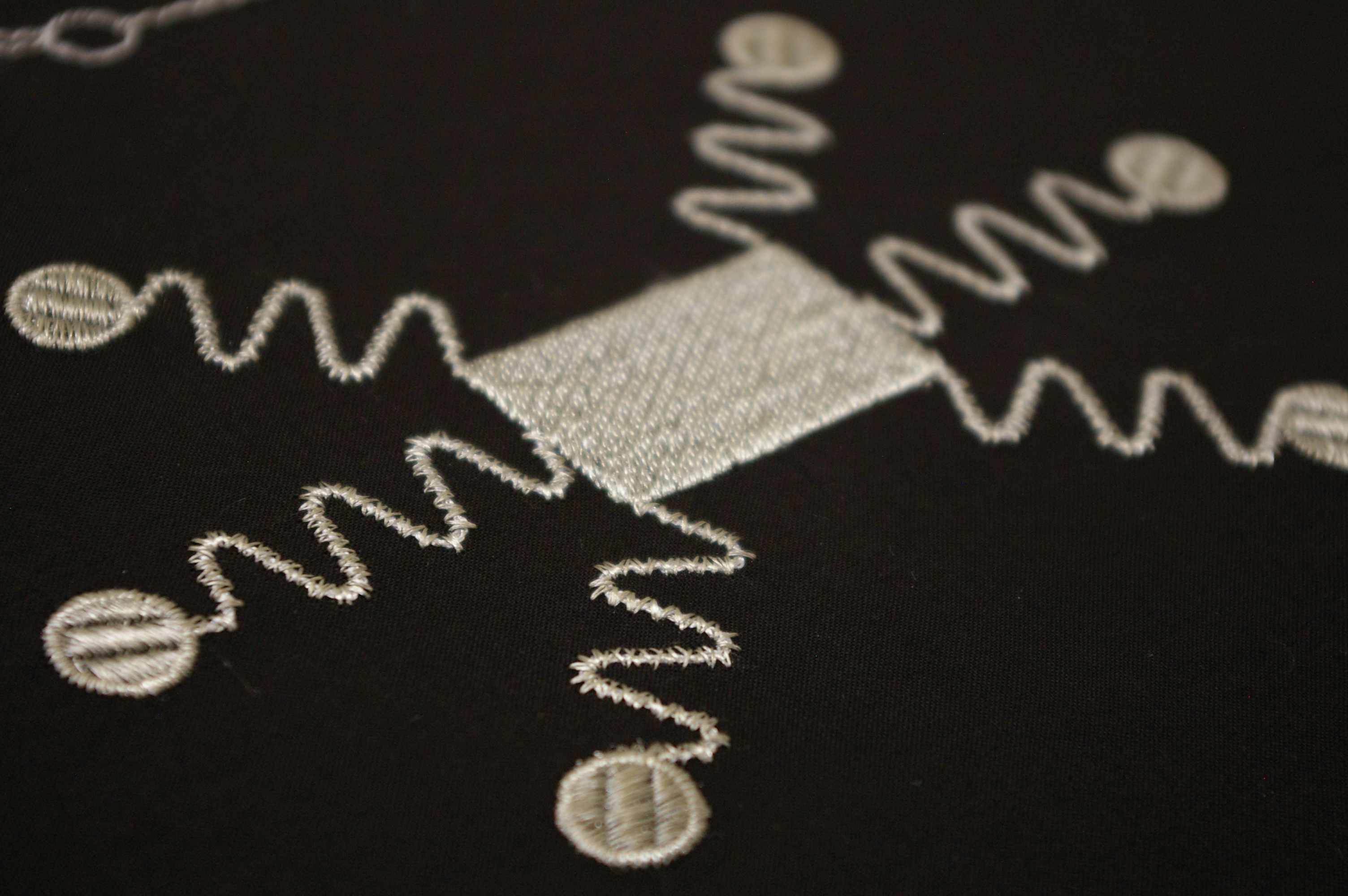
Embroidered conductive thread

A conductive textile is a fabric which can conduct electricity. Conductive textiles known as lamé are made with guipé thread or yarn that is conductive because it is composed of metallic fibers wrapped around a non-metallic core or has a metallic coating. A different way of achieving conductivity is to weave metallic strands into the textile.

Some historic fabrics use yarns of solid metals, most commonly gold. Alternatively, novel materials such as nanomaterials (including graphene, and carbon nanotubes) or conducting polymers may also be used as the conducting materials. There is also an interest in semiconducting textiles, made by impregnating normal textiles with carbon- or metal-based powders.

Conductive fibers consist of a non-conductive or less conductive substrate, which is then either coated or embedded with electrically conductive elements, often carbon, nickel, copper, gold, silver, titanium or PEDOT. Metals may be deposited chemically with autocatalytic chemistry, printed with conductive nanoparticle inks, or applied with physical vapor deposition methods. Substrates typically include cotton, polyester, nylon, and stainless steel to high performance fibers such as aramids and PBO. Straddling the worlds of textiles and wires, conductive fibers are sold either by weight or length, and measured in denier or AWG.

Because of the rapid growth in the kinds of conductive fibers and the uses of these fibers, a trade association—the Conductive Fiber Manufacturers Council—was formed to increase awareness, utilization, and possibly standardize terminology.

== Applications ==
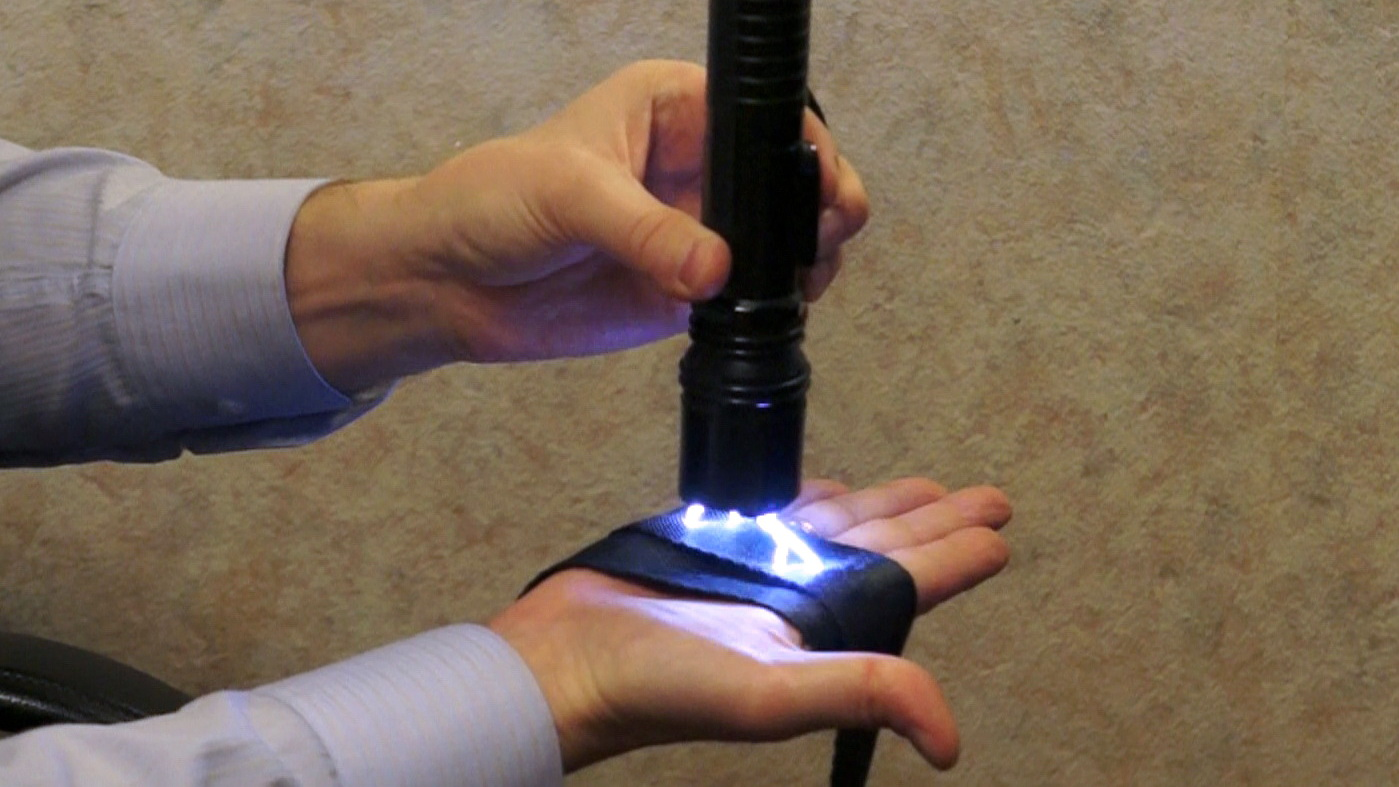
Carbon tape Taser-proof vest on Instructables

Uses for conductive fibers and textiles may include static dissipation, EMI shielding, signal and power transfer in low resistance versions, and as a heating element in higher resistance versions. Their benefits over solid or stranded metal wires come from conductive fibers' flexibility and ability to use them in existing textile and wire machinery (weaving, knitting, braiding, etc.).

The sport of fencing employs lamés, jackets made of conductive textiles, to detect hits in competitions.

One major use is by Micro Coax's ARACON fiber built on a Kevlar base, and used for shielding cabling in air- and spacecraft and other speciality purposes where light weight, high strength, and high-frequency shielding is imperative. Another more recent use is in the production of 'stun gun' or Taser-proof clothing, where the conductive textile forms a flexible Faraday cage in a layer of the garment. Conductive fabric can also be used to make electrodes for EEG and other medical applications; such electrodes were used in a commercially available sleep-monitoring device made by former company Zeo, Inc. Highly conductive stainless steel fiber is available.

== See also ==
- Faraday cage
- E-textiles
- Cloth of Gold
