= Eugene Galanter =

American cognitive psychologist (1924–2016)

- Born: October 27, 1924; Philadelphia, Pennsylvania, US
- Died: November 9, 2016 (aged 92); New York City, New York, US
- Education: Swarthmore College; University of Pennsylvania
- Awards: NASA Distinguished Scientist Research Award
- Scientific career
- Fields: Psychology; Psychometrics; Psychophysics; Experimental psychology
- Workplaces: Columbia University

Eugene Galanter (1924–2016) was one of the modern founders of cognitive psychology. He was an academic in the field of experimental psychology and an author. Dr. Galanter was Professor Emeritus of Psychology and Quondam Director of the Psychophysics Laboratory at Columbia University. He was also the co-founder, Chairman of the Board of Directors and Chief Scientific Officer of Children’s Progress, an award-winning New York City-based company that specializes in the use of computer technology in early education. The company's assessments and reports have been used in 40 states and 9 countries.

== Biography ==
After serving in the United States Armed Forces in World War II, Galanter attended Swarthmore College, receiving an Honors B.A. in 1950. He went on to graduate school in psychology at the University of Pennsylvania and after receiving his Ph.D. in 1953, he was appointed Assistant Professor of Mathematical Psychology in the University of Pennsylvania's Department of Psychology. Additionally, during several leaves in the 1950s, Galanter collaborated with S. S. Stevens at Harvard University's psychoacoustics laboratory, co-authoring several publications.

While a fellow at the Center for Advanced Study in the Behavioral Sciences of Stanford University Galanter began a collaboration with George A. Miller, and Karl H. Pribram, that resulted in the book Plans and the Structure of Behavior, a seminal work in the development of cognitive psychology published in 1960. By 1956, Galanter had started working towards a theoretical model that would integrate cognitive processes into the behaviorist's stimulus-response framework. In Plans and the Structure of Behavior, Miller, Galanter, and Pribram proposed that "some mediating organization of experience is necessary" between the stimulus and its behavioral response, i.e., that a cognitive feedback loop, which includes monitoring devices, must control the acquisition of the stimulus-response relationship. This feedback loop, the proposed fundamental unit of behavior, was referred to in Plans as the T.O.T.E., an abbreviation of its steps - test, operate, test, exit.

Following the publication of Plans and the Structure of Behavior, Galanter, along with colleagues Robert Bush and Duncan Luce, worked to move the field of psychology closer to the other natural sciences by advancing the position of mathematical psychology within the discipline as a whole. Their argument was that all psychological phenomena, if properly measured and reduced to quantifiable variables, would reveal law-like rules that govern human behavior and thought. Together, Galanter, Bush, and Luce edited the three volume Handbook of Mathematical Psychology, which was published in 1963.

After leaving the University of Pennsylvania, Galanter held positions at the University of Washington and Harvard University before becoming the Gelhorn Professor of Psychology at Columbia University, where he was also Director of the Psychophysics Laboratory and, for a time, Chairman of the Department of Psychology. In addition to his work in psychophysics and mathematical psychology, Galanter continues to publish in various subfields of psychometrics including psychoeducational assessment and motivational measurement. Galanter has been honored by NASA, which awarded him its Distinguished Scientist Research Award.

After co-founding Children's Progress, Galanter went on to serve as Chief Scientific Officer. Galanter and his daughter Michelle Galanter co-invented and hold the United States patent for the Galanter Educational Evaluation Lattice, which is licensed exclusively to Children’s Progress and is the basis for the Children’s Progress Academic Assessment (CPAA). This dynamic assessment is based on a developmental model of learning and is grounded in the work of psychologist Lev Vygotsky. Unlike traditional assessments that determine whether a student’s answers are right or wrong, the CPAA adjusts to every response and provides hints and scaffolding whenever a student struggles with a concept. This technology then gives teachers better information about each student, and enables them to deliver targeted instruction, tailored to each student’s zone of proximal development (ZPD).

As part of the NWEA (Northwest Evaluation Association) acquisition of Children's Progress in mid-2012, Dr. Galanter worked with NWEA to further its mission : Helping all Kids Learn.

== Books ==
- Galanter, Eugene (1959). Automatic teaching: the state of the art. New York: John Wiley & Sons, Inc.
- Galanter, Eugene; Miller, George A. (1960), "Some comments on Stochastic models and psychological theories", in Arrow, Kenneth J.; Karlin, Samuel; Suppes, Patrick (eds.), Mathematical models in the social sciences, 1959: Proceedings of the first Stanford symposium, Stanford mathematical studies in the social sciences, IV, Stanford, California: Stanford University Press, pp. 277–297, ISBN 9780804700214.
- Galanter, Eugene; Miller, George; Pribram, Karl (1960). Plans and the structure of behavior. New York: Holt, Rinehart and Winston. ISBN 0-03-010075-5.
- Galanter, Eugene; Luce, R.D.; Bush, R.R. (1963–1965). The handbook of mathematical psychology (3 volumes). New York: John Wiley & Sons, Inc. — Volume 2 at archive.org
- Galanter, Eugene; Luce, R.D.; Bush, R.R. (1964–1965). Readings in mathematical psychology (3 volumes). New York: John Wiley & Sons, Inc.
- Galanter, Eugene (1966). Textbook of elementary psychology. San Francisco: Holden-Day.
- Galanter, Eugene (1983). The parents' microcomputer handbook. New York: Putnam.
- Galanter, Eugene (1984). Elementary programming for kids in BASIC. New York: Putnam.
- Galanter, Eugene (1985). Advanced programming handbook. New York: Putnam.
- Galanter, Eugene (2004). Psych Tech Notes; Version 2.2 CD, Adams, Bannister, Cox: New York.
- Galanter, Eugene (2010). People, preferences & prices. Oak Park: Bentham Science Publishers Ltd.
