= The Magical Number Seven, Plus or Minus Two =

1956 psychology paper by George Miller on working memory capacity

"The Magical Number Seven, Plus or Minus Two: Some Limits on Our Capacity for Processing Information" is one of the most highly cited papers in psychology. It was written by the cognitive psychologist George A. Miller of Harvard University's Department of Psychology and published in 1956 in Psychological Review. It is often interpreted to argue that the number of objects an average human can hold in short-term memory is 7 ± 2. This has occasionally been referred to as Miller's law.

== Miller's article ==
In his article, Miller discussed a coincidence between the limits of one-dimensional absolute judgment and the limits of short-term memory. In a one-dimensional absolute-judgment task, a person is presented with a number of stimuli that vary on one dimension (e.g., 10 different tones varying only in pitch) and responds to each stimulus with a corresponding response (learned before). Performance is nearly perfect up to five or six different stimuli but declines as the number of different stimuli increases. The task can be described as one of information transmission: The input consists of one out of n possible stimuli, and the output consists of one out of n responses. The information contained in the input can be determined by the number of binary decisions that need to be made to arrive at the selected stimulus, and the same holds for the response. Therefore, people's maximum performance on a one-dimensional absolute judgment can be characterized as an information channel capacity with approximately 2 to 3 bits of information, which corresponds to the ability to distinguish between four and eight alternatives.

The second cognitive limitation Miller discusses is memory span. Memory span refers to the longest list of items (e.g., digits, letters, words) that a person can repeat back in the correct order on 50% of trials immediately after the presentation. Miller observed that the memory span of young adults is approximately seven items. He noticed that memory span is approximately the same for stimuli with vastly different amounts of information—for instance, binary digits have 1 bit each; decimal digits have 3.32 bits each; words have about 10 bits each. Miller concluded that memory span is not limited in terms of bits but rather in terms of chunks. A chunk is the largest meaningful unit in the presented material that the person recognizes—thus, what counts as a chunk depends on the knowledge of the person being tested. For instance, a word is a single chunk for a speaker of the language but is many chunks for someone who is totally unfamiliar with the language and sees the word as a collection of phonetic segments.

Miller recognized that the correspondence between the limits of one-dimensional absolute judgment and of short-term memory span was only a coincidence, because only the first limit, not the second, can be characterized in information-theoretic terms (i.e., as a roughly constant number of bits). Therefore, there is nothing "magical" about the number seven, and Miller used the expression only rhetorically. Nevertheless, the idea of a "magical number 7" inspired much theorizing, rigorous and less rigorous, about the capacity limits of human cognition. The number seven constitutes a useful heuristic, reminding us that lists that are much longer than that become significantly harder to remember and process simultaneously.

== The "magical number 7" and working memory capacity ==
Later research on short-term memory and working memory revealed that memory span is not a constant even when measured in a number of chunks. The number of chunks a human can recall immediately after presentation depends on the category of chunks used (e.g., span is around seven for digits, around six for letters, and around five for words), and even on features of the chunks within a category. Chunking is used by the brain's short-term memory as a method for keeping groups of information accessible for easy recall. It functions and works best as labels that one is already familiar with—the incorporation of new information into a label that is already well rehearsed into one's long-term memory. These chunks must store the information in such a way that they can be disassembled into the necessary data.

The storage capacity is dependent on the information being stored. For instance, span is lower for long words than it is for short words. In general, memory span for verbal contents (digits, letters, words, etc.) strongly depends on the time it takes to speak the contents aloud. Some researchers have therefore proposed that the limited capacity of short-term memory for verbal material is not a "magic number" but rather a "magic spell," i.e. a period of time. Baddeley used this finding to postulate that one component of his model of working memory, the phonological loop, is capable of holding around 2 seconds of sound. However, the limit of short-term memory cannot easily be characterized as a constant "magic spell" either, because memory span also depends on other factors besides speaking duration. For instance, span depends on the lexical status of the contents (i.e., whether the contents are words known to the person or not). Several other factors also affect a person's measured span, and therefore it is difficult to pin down the capacity of short-term or working memory to a number of chunks. Nonetheless, Cowan has proposed that working memory has a capacity of about four chunks in young adults (and less in children and older adults).

Tarnow finds that in a classic experiment typically argued as supporting a 4 item buffer by Murdock, there is in fact no evidence for such and thus the "magical number", at least in the Murdock experiment, is 1. Other prominent theories of short-term memory capacity argue against measuring capacity in terms of a fixed number of elements.

== Other cognitive numeric limits ==
Cowan also noted a number of other limits of cognition that point to a "magical number four", and different from Miller, he argued that this correspondence is no coincidence. One other process that seems to be limited at about four elements is subitizing, the rapid enumeration of small numbers of objects. When a number of objects are flashed briefly, their number can be determined very quickly, at a glance, when the number does not exceed the subitizing limit, which is about four objects. Larger numbers of objects must be counted, which is a slower process.

The 1988 film Rain Man portrayed an autistic savant, who was able to rapidly determine the number of toothpicks from an entire box spilled on the floor, apparently subitizing a much larger number than four objects. A similar feat was informally observed by neuropsychologist Oliver Sacks and reported in his book 1985 The Man Who Mistook His Wife for a Hat. Therefore, one might suppose that this limit is an arbitrary limit imposed by our cognition rather than necessarily being a physical limit. Autism expert Daniel Tammet has suggested, however, that the children Sacks observed may have pre-counted the matches in the box. There is also evidence that even four chunks is a high estimate: Gobet and Clarkson at Brunel University London conducted an experiment and found that over half of the memory recall conditions yielded only about two chunks. Research also shows that the size, rather than the number, of chunks that are stored in short-term memory is what allows for enhanced memory in individuals.

== See also ==
- Baddeley's model of working memory
- Chunking (psychology)
- Cognitive dimensions of notations
- Fitts's law
- The forgetting curve and Alan Watts on biopsychological persona self-forgetfulness
- Free recall
- Hick's law
- Working memory
