= Dun & Bradstreet Credibility Corp =

Defunct American credit assistance company

- Company type: Private
- Founded: Malibu, California 2010
- Headquarters: Malibu, California, U.S.
- Key people: Jeff Stibel, Chairman & CEO.
- Products: Business information
- Website: www.dandb.com

Dun & Bradstreet Credibility Corp was a privately held company headquartered in Malibu, California until it was purchased by Dun & Bradstreet in a $320 million deal that closed in May 2015. The company provided assistance with credit and credibility for businesses in the U.S. and Canada. The company was formed in July 2010 when it acquired the North American Credit-on-Self division, also known as the Self Awareness Solutions (SAS) operating unit, of Dun & Bradstreet after raising approximately $200M from Great Hill Partners. Internet entrepreneur Jeff Stibel was the chairman and CEO.

== History ==
In 2010, Dun and Bradstreet, formed in 1841, spun off assets that merged with newly created Credibility Solutions to form Dun & Bradstreet Credibility Corp. The company grew from 8 employees to over 600 after becoming an independent entity in 2010. Dun & Bradstreet said Dun & Bradstreet Credibility Corp. is a 'separate legal entity' that pays D&B royalties for certain intellectual-property rights. These included "a perpetual license to use the D&B brand".

In 2012, it launched an advocacy initiative, Access to Capital, designed to help business owners understand the type of loans available and which may be right for their business. This initiative also included a quarterly survey produced with Pepperdine University and a series of education and matchmaking events across the country. Also in 2012, the company launched its 529 education savings plan initiative with a multiple match, which was discussed in the Wall Street Journal the New York Times and US News. Dun & Bradstreet Credibility Corp., through this initiative, donated $150,000 to the Santa Monica-Malibu school district in 2013, as well as additional amounts to school districts in Bethlehem, Tucson and Guilford County.

== Products and services ==
The firm's products and services include the DUNSFile, which establishes a business's DUNS number and basic credit file, CreditBuilder, which helps businesses monitor and build their credit file, giving them full access to the D&B scores and reports, and the ability to submit trade references to D&B for its acceptance and approval, CreditAdvisor, which allows the businesses to see other companies' reports and receive email alerts when competitors’ scores or ratings change, Credibility Review, which allows businesses to take control of their online presence and CreditSignal, a free product offering which provides companies with alerts, informing them of changes in their D&B credit scores and ratings.
