= Gordon Moskowitz =

Gordon Blaine Moskowitz (born October 6, 1963) is a social psychologist working in the field of social cognition. He is currently a professor in the Department of Psychology at Lehigh University. He is co-organizer of an annual social cognition conference -- the Person Memory Interest Group. His primary research interests are in examining: 1) social inferences which occur with neither the intention of forming an impression nor the awareness that one has done so (i.e., the extent to which social inferences, especially stereotypes, are spontaneous); and 2) the non-conscious nature of motivation and goals, with emphasis on how the goals to be egalitarian and creative are more efficiently pursued when one is not consciously trying to pursue them. This work has been applied to the question of how stereotypes impact medical diagnosis and treatment and contribute to health disparities, as well as to how medical training can implement what is known about controlling stereotyping and prejudice to reduce such bias and minimize health disparities. His work illustrates that some attempts to update stereotypes and attitudes can backfire, and this must be considered when planning interventions to reduce bias in organizations (such as hospitals and universities) so that such interventions can succeed rather than cause resentment.

== Biography ==
Moskowitz was born in Brooklyn, New York to Howard and Geraldine Moskowitz. He attended McGill University (B.Sc. 1984) and New York University (Ph.D. 1993). His post-doctoral training was at the Max Planck Institute on Leopoldstrasse in Munich, Germany. From 1994 through 2001 he was an assistant professor of psychology at Princeton University. He is married to Cynthia Gooch, a Neuroscientist at Temple University.

== Research topics ==
- the nature of stereotyping and the question of how people can prevent stereotypic thoughts from occurring or, if they do occur, prevent stereotypic thinking from influencing their evaluations of and actions toward others.
- the "snap judgments" made when hearing about, meeting, or observing others; the "automaticity" of human inferential processes and the extent to which goals and motives can be equally "automatic."
- how and when people update or change their "snap judgments" and the extent to which attempts to change unwanted judgments, such as interventions aimed at reducing stereotyping, can cause backlash and make people "dig in" and defend their unwanted beliefs rather than update them.
- the manner in which goals, operating outside of conscious awareness, control cognition, such as 1) egalitarian goals inhibiting one's stereotypes, 2) perspective taking goals, and 3) creativity goals inhibiting typical thoughts in favor of more atypical and unique ones.
- the extent to which people are persuaded or influenced by minority messengers: the cognitive economy which directs initial thoughts toward minorities and how motives which instigate more elaborate thought processes lead to greater minority influence.
- a motive termed "the need for structure" and how the desire to control, understand, and structure the events and people which make up one's social world affects the way in which one perceives and acts.

== Publications ==
=== Books ===
- Moskowitz, G.B. Introduction to Social Cognition: The Essential Questions and Ideas. NY, NY: The Guilford Press, 2024.
- Balcetis, E. & Moskowitz, G.B. (Eds., 2023). Handbook of Impression Formation. New York: Psychology Press/Taylor and Francis.
- Moskowitz, G.B., & Grant, H. (Eds., 2009). The Psychology of Goals. New York, NY: Guilford Press.
- Moskowitz, G.B. Social Cognition: Understanding Self and Others. NY, NY: The Guilford Press, 2005.
- Moskowitz, G.B. (Ed., 2001). Cognitive Social Psychology: The Princeton symposium on the legacy and future of social cognition. Hillsdale, NJ: Erlbaum.

=== Journal articles ===
- Olcaysoy Okten, I., & Moskowitz, G. B. (2024). Understanding Impression Updating through Behavior Predictions. Social Cognition, 4, 198-232.
- Wolsiefer, K., Mehl, M. Moskowitz, G.B., Cagno, C., Zestcott, CA., Tejeda-Padron, A., & Stone, J. (2023). Investigating the Relationship between Resident Physician Implicit Bias and Language Use during a Clinical Encounter with Hispanic Patients, Health Communication, 38:1, 124-132, DOI: 10.1080/10410236.2021.1936756
- Rothman, N., Vitriol, J., & Moskowitz, G.B. (2022). Internal conflict and prejudice-regulation: Emotional ambivalence buffers against defensive responding to implicit bias feedback. PLOSOne, 17(3): e0264535. https://doi.org/10.1371/journal. pone.0264535
- Sassenberg, K., Winter, K., Becker, D., Ditrich, D., Scholl, A., & Moskowitz, G.B. (2021). The flexibility mindset: Reducing the impact of undesired spontaneous inclinations. European Review of Social Psychology, 33(1), 171-213. DOI: 10.1080/10463283.2021.1959124.
- Vitriol, J., & Moskowitz, G.B. (2021). Reducing Defensive Responding to Implicit Bias Feedback: On the Role of Perceived Moral Threat and Efficacy to Change. Journal of Experimental Social Psychology, 96, 1-16. https://doi.org/10.1016/j.jesp.2021.104165
- Olcaysoy Okten, I., & Moskowitz, G.B. (2020). Easy to Make, Hard to Revise: Updating Spontaneous Trait Inferences in the Presence of Trait-Inconsistent Information. Social Cognition, 38(6), 571-624.
- Olcaysoy Okten, I., & Moskowitz, G.B. (2020). Spontaneous goal versus spontaneous trait inferences: How ideology shapes attributions and explanations. European Journal of Social Psychology, 50(1), 177-188.
- Stone, J., Moskowitz, G.B., Zestcott, C. & Wolsiefer, K. (2020). Testing active learning workshops for reducing implicit stereotyping of Hispanics by majority and minority group medical students. Stigma and Health, 5(1), 94-103.
- Olcaysoy Okten, I., Schneid, E., & Moskowitz, G.B. (2019). On the Updating of Spontaneous Impressions. Journal of Personality and Social Psychology, 117(1), 1-25.
- Olcaysoy Okten, I., & Moskowitz, G.B. (2018). Goal vs. Trait Explanations: Causal attributions beyond the trait-situation dichotomy. Journal of Personality and Social Psychology, 114 (2), 211-229.
- Moskowitz, G.B., & Carter, D. (2018). Confirmation Bias and the Stereotype of the Black Athlete. Psychology of Sport and Exercise, 36, 139-146.
- Moskowitz, G.B., Stone, J., & Childs, A. (2012). "Implicit Stereotyping and Medical Decisions: Unconscious Stereotype Activation in Practitioners’ Thoughts About African Americans". American Journal of Public Health.
- Stone, J., & Moskowitz, G.B. (2011). "Nonconscious racial bias in medical decision-making: What can be done to avoid it?" Medical Education, 45, 768–776.
- Moskowitz, G.B., & Li, P. (2011). "Egalitarian Goals Trigger Stereotype Inhibition: A Proactive Form of Stereotype Control". Journal of Experimental Social Psychology, 47(1), 103–116.
- Moskowitz, G.B.(2010). "On the Control Over Stereotype Activation and Stereotype Inhibition". Social and Personality Psychology Compass, 4 (2), 140–158.
- Galinsky, A.D., & Moskowitz, G.B. (2007). "Further ironies of suppression: Stereotype and counter-stereotype accessibility". Journal of Experimental Social Psychology, 42, 833–841.
- Sassenberg, K. & Moskowitz, G.B. (2005). "Do not stereotype, think different! Overcoming automatic stereotype activation by mindset priming". Journal of Experimental Social Psychology, 41 (5), 317–413.
- Moskowitz, G.B., Salomon, A.R., & Taylor, C.M. (2000). "Preconsciously controlling stereotyping: Implicitly activated egalitarian goals prevent the activation of stereotypes." Social Cognition, 18, 151–177.
- Moskowitz, G.B., Gollwitzer, P.M., Wasel, W., & Schaal, B. (1999). "Preconscious control of stereotype activation through chronic egalitarian goals." Journal of Personality and Social Psychology, 77, 167-184
- Thompson, E.P., Roman, R.J., Moskowitz, G.B., Chaiken, S., & Bargh, J.A. (1994). "Accuracy motivation attenuates covert priming effects: The systematic reprocessing of social information." Journal of Personality and Social Psychology, 66, 474–489.

=== Other ===
- Moskowitz, G.B., & Olcaysoy Okten, I. (2024). Major Themes in the History of Social Cognition. In D. Carlston, K. Hugenberg, & K. Johnson (Eds.), Handbook of Social Cognition, Volume Two (pp. 20-68). Oxford University Press. https://doi.org/10.1093/oxfordhb/9780197763414.013.2
- Moskowitz, G.B., Olcaysoy Okten, I., & Schneid, E. (2023). The Updating of First Impressions. In E. Balcetis & G.B. Moskowitz (Eds.). Handbook of Impression Formation: A Social Psychological Approach (pp. 348-392). New York: Routledge.
- Moskowitz, G.B., & Vitriol, J.A. (2022). A Social Cognition Model of Bias Reduction. In A. Nordstrom & W. Goodfriend (Eds.), Innovative Stigma and Discrimination Reduction Programs (pp. 1-39). Oxon, UK: Taylor and Francis.
- Moskowitz, G.B., Olcaysoy Okten, I., & Gooch, C.M. (2017). Distortion in time perception as a result of concern about appearing biased. PLOSOne, 12(8): e0182241. https://doi.org/10.1371/journal.pone.0182241.
- Moskowitz, G.B. (2012). The Representation and Regulation of Goals. In A. Elliot, & H. Aarts (Eds.), Goal-Directed Behavior. New York: Psychology Press/Taylor and Francis.
- Moskowitz, G.B., & Li, P. (2010). Implicit Control of Stereotype Activation. In Hassin, R., Ochsner, K. and Trope, Y. (Eds.), Self Control in society, mind, and brain (pp. 354– 374). London: Oxford University Press.
- Moskowitz, G.B. (2009). Goal Priming. In G.B. Moskowitz, & H. Grant (Eds.), The Psychology of Goals (203-233). New York: The Guilford Press.
- Andersen, S.A., Moskowitz, G.B., Blair, I.V., & Nosek, B.A. (2007). Automatic Thought. In E.T. Higgins & A. Kruglanski (Eds.) Social Psychology: Handbook of Basic Principles (Volume 2). New York: Guilford.
- Moskowitz, G.B., Li, P., & Kirk, E. (2004). The implicit volition model: On the preconscious regulation of temporarily adopted goals. In M. Zanna (Ed.), Advances in Experimental Social Psychology (Volume 36, pp. 317–413). San Diego, CA: Academic Press.
- Moskowitz, G. B., & Chaiken, S. (2001) "Mediators of minority social influence: Cognitive processing mechanisms revealed through a persuasion paradigm." In N. de Vries & C. de Dreu (Eds.), Group innovation. Fundamental and applied perspectives. Oxford, Blackwell.
- Moskowitz, G.B., Skurnik, I., & Galinsky, A. (1999). "The history of dual process notions; The future of preconscious control." In S. Chaiken and Y. Trope (Eds.), Dual Process Models in Social Psychology (pp. 12–36). New York: Guilford.
- Gollwitzer, P.M., & Moskowitz, G.B. (1996). "Goal effects on action and cognition." In E.T. Higgins & A. Kruglanski (Eds.) Social Psychology: Handbook of Basic Principles (pp. 361–399). New York: Guilford.
- Uleman, J.S., Newman, L.S., & Moskowitz, G.B. (1996). "People as flexible interpreters: Evidence and issues from spontaneous trait inference." In M. Zanna (Ed.), Advances in Experimental Social Psychology, 28, 211–280. San Diego, CA: Academic Press.
