= Katie A. McLaughlin =

American psychologist

- Occupation: Professor of clinical psychology
- Awards: APA Distinguished Scientific Early Career Contributions to Psychology (2016); Gerald R. Klerman Award for Outstanding Clinical Research Achievement (2016)

Academic background
- Education: University of Virginia; Pennsylvania State University; Yale University
- Thesis: A public health approach to the study and prevention of adolescent depression & anxiety

Academic work
- Institutions: University of Oregon;Harvard University

Katie A. McLaughlin is an American clinical psychologist and developmental scientist whose research examines how childhood adversity and stress influence brain development and risk for mental disorders. She is the Executive Director of the Ballmer Institute for Children's Behavioral Health and Knight Chair and Professor of Psychology at the University of Oregon. She is internationally recognized for her contributions to developmental psychopathology, including the conceptualization of “dimensional models” of adversity and the identification of neurodevelopmental mechanisms linking early-life stress to later psychopathology.

Her work integrates psychology, neuroscience, and epidemiology to improve understanding of how social inequality and environmental experiences shape mental health across the lifespan. She has been recognized as a Highly Cited Researcher by Web of Science each year since 2016 and is a Fellow of the Association for Psychological Science.

== Early life and education ==
McLaughlin earned her B.A. summa cum laude from the University of Virginia in 2002, where she was elected to Phi Beta Kappa, Psi Chi, and the Golden Key Honor Society. She received an M.S. in Clinical Psychology from Pennsylvania State University in 2004 and went on to complete dual doctoral degrees in Clinical Psychology and Epidemiology & Public Health at Yale University in 2008. During her doctoral and postdoctoral training, she was supported by a National Research Service Award from the National Institute of Mental Health and subsequently completed postdoctoral and research fellowships at the Harvard School of Public Health, Harvard Medical School, and the Harvard Center for Population and Development Studies as a Robert Wood Johnson Health & Society Scholar.

== Academic career ==
McLaughlin began her academic career as an Instructor in Health Care Policy at Harvard Medical School (2010–2011) and Assistant Professor of Pediatrics and Psychiatry (2011–2013). She also served as Associate Research Scientist at Boston Children’s Hospital and was affiliated with the Harvard Center for Population and Development Studies during this period.

In 2013, she joined the University of Washington, where she became Assistant Professor of Psychology and Adjunct Assistant Professor of Pediatrics and Psychiatry. She was promoted to Associate Professor in 2016. At Washington, she founded the Stress and Development Laboratory, which investigates the impact of childhood adversity on emotional, cognitive, and neural development.

McLaughlin moved to Harvard University in 2018 as Assistant Professor of Psychology, later becoming John L. Loeb Associate Professor of the Social Sciences, and Professor of Psychology in 2021. In 2023, she was appointed Executive Director of the Ballmer Institute for Children’s Behavioral Health at the University of Oregon, where she also holds the Knight Chair in Psychology. She maintains an affiliation as a Visiting Scholar in Harvard’s Department of Psychology.

In 2026, she was inducted into the American Academy of Arts and Sciences.

== Research ==
McLaughlin works in the area of affective neuroscience and developmental psychology, concentrating on how situations involving childhood adversity, trauma, and stress influence cognitive, emotional and neurobiological development in young children and teenagers. She has worked on large-scale studies linking childhood adversity and adult psychopathology including the World Health Organization (WHO) World Mental Health Surveys. and the National Comorbidity Survey. The results of her research indicate that adversities during childhood and adolescence heighten individuals' risk of developing mental disorders, including major depression and anxiety disorders.

=== Dimensional models of adversity ===
A central focus of McLaughlin’s work is the development of dimensional models of childhood adversity, particularly the distinction between threat (experiences involving harm or threat of harm, such as interpersonal violence) and deprivation (absence of expected cognitive and social input, such as neglect or institutional rearing). Her research shows that these dimensions are associated with different neurodevelopmental processes: threat is more strongly linked to emotional processing and fear-learning systems, while deprivation is more closely related to language development, cognitive stimulation, and frontoparietal networks supporting executive function.

=== Neurodevelopmental mechanisms ===
Using task-based and resting-state fMRI, structural MRI, psychophysiology, and longitudinal designs, McLaughlin has identified neurodevelopmental pathways linking adversity to internalizing and externalizing psychopathology. Findings from this work include altered threat processing and amygdala responsiveness following violence exposure, associations between deprivation and reduced cortical thickness and frontoparietal network development, and evidence that different forms of adversity are linked to distinct trajectories of brain maturation, stress reactivity, and biological aging across development.

McLaughlin leads and co-leads multi-site longitudinal studies and participates in large research consortia, including ENIGMA and Psychiatric Genomics Consortium workgroups focused on trauma-related phenotypes. Her research integrates epidemiologic, neuroimaging, and genetic data to examine population-level associations between early adversity and later psychiatric outcomes.

=== Translational and intervention research ===
McLaughlin’s work also includes the development and evaluation of prevention and early-intervention approaches informed by neurodevelopmental findings. These efforts include screening and early-intervention models in pediatric primary care, targeted prevention programs for children exposed to trauma, and online mental health interventions developed during the COVID-19 pandemic.

== Awards and recognition ==
- Inducted into the American Academy of Arts and Sciences (2026)
- Ruane Prize for Outstanding Achievement in Child & Adolescent Psychiatric Research, Brain and Behavior Foundation (2023)
- Distinguished Friend of Behavior Therapy, Association for Behavioral and Cognitive Therapies (2023)
- MERIT Award, National Institute of Mental Health (2020)
- Fellow, Association for Psychological Science (2020)
- Neuropsychopharmacology Editor’s Award for Transformative Original Report (2017)
- Distinguished Scientific Award for Early Career Contribution to Psychology, American Psychological Association (2016)
- Gerald R. Klerman Award for Outstanding Clinical Research Achievement, Brain and Behavior Foundation (2016)
- Jacobs Foundation Early Career Research Fellowship (2015)
- Susan Nolen-Hoeksema Early Career Award, Society for the Science of Clinical Psychology (2014)
- Chaim and Bela Daniel Early Career Award, International Society for Traumatic Stress Studies (2013)
- Charles H. Hood Foundation Child Health Research Award (2012)
- Robert Wood Johnson Health & Society Scholar (2008–2010)

Since 2016, McLaughlin has been named a Highly Cited Researcher by Web of Science.

== Representative publications ==
- McLaughlin, K. A.; Conron, K. J.; Koenen, K. C.; Gilman, S. E. (October 2010). "Childhood adversity, adult stressful life events, and risk of past-year psychiatric disorder: a test of the stress sensitization hypothesis in a population-based sample of adults". Psychological Medicine. 40 (10): 1647–1658. doi:10.1017/S0033291709992121. PMC 2891275. PMID 20018126.
- McLaughlin, Katie A.; Greif Green, Jennifer; Gruber, Michael J.; Sampson, Nancy A.; Zaslavsky, Alan M.; Kessler, Ronald C. (1 November 2012). "Childhood Adversities and First Onset of Psychiatric Disorders in a National Sample of US Adolescents". Archives of General Psychiatry. 69 (11): 1151–1160. doi:10.1001/archgenpsychiatry.2011.2277. PMC 3490224. PMID 23117636.
- McLaughlin, Katie A.; Koenen, Karestan C.; Hill, Eric D.; Petukhova, Maria; Sampson, Nancy A.; Zaslavsky, Alan M.; Kessler, Ronald C. (August 2013). "Trauma Exposure and Posttraumatic Stress Disorder in a National Sample of Adolescents". Journal of the American Academy of Child & Adolescent Psychiatry. 52 (8): 815–830.e14. doi:10.1016/j.jaac.2013.05.011. PMC 3724231. PMID 23880492.
- McLaughlin, Katie A.; Hatzenbuehler, Mark L.; Mennin, Douglas S.; Nolen-Hoeksema, Susan (September 2011). "Emotion dysregulation and adolescent psychopathology: A prospective study". Behaviour Research and Therapy. 49 (9): 544–554. doi:10.1016/j.brat.2011.06.003. PMC 3153591. PMID 21718967.
- McLaughlin, Katie A.; Nolen-Hoeksema, Susan (March 2011). "Rumination as a transdiagnostic factor in depression and anxiety". Behaviour Research and Therapy. 49 (3): 186–193. doi:10.1016/j.brat.2010.12.006. PMC 3042543. PMID 21238951.
