= Miller's law =

Name of various principles

Miller's law can refer to four unrelated principles.

== In communication ==
The Miller's law used in communication was formulated by George Armitage Miller (1920–2012), a professor of psychology at Princeton University, as part of his theory of communication. According to it, one should suspend judgment about what someone else is saying to first understand them without imbuing their message with personal interpretations.

...that in order to understand what someone is telling you, it is necessary for you to assume the person is being truthful, then imagine what could be true about it.

— George Miller

== In linguistics ==
The Miller's law used in linguistics is a sound law of postnasal deaspiration in ancient Greek.

== In psychology ==
The Miller's law used in psychology is the observation, also by George Armitage Miller, that the number of objects the average person can hold in working memory is about seven. It was put forward in a 1956 edition of Psychological Review in a paper titled "The Magical Number Seven, Plus or Minus Two".

== In software development ==
The Miller's law used in software development was formulated by Mike Beltzner and is named in respect of Dave Miller, long-standing owner of the Bugzilla product:

All discussions of incremental updates to Bugzilla will eventually trend towards proposals for large scale redesigns or feature additions or replacements for Bugzilla.

— Mike Beltzner

== See also ==
- Principle of charity
