= Matthew Nock =

American clinical psychologist

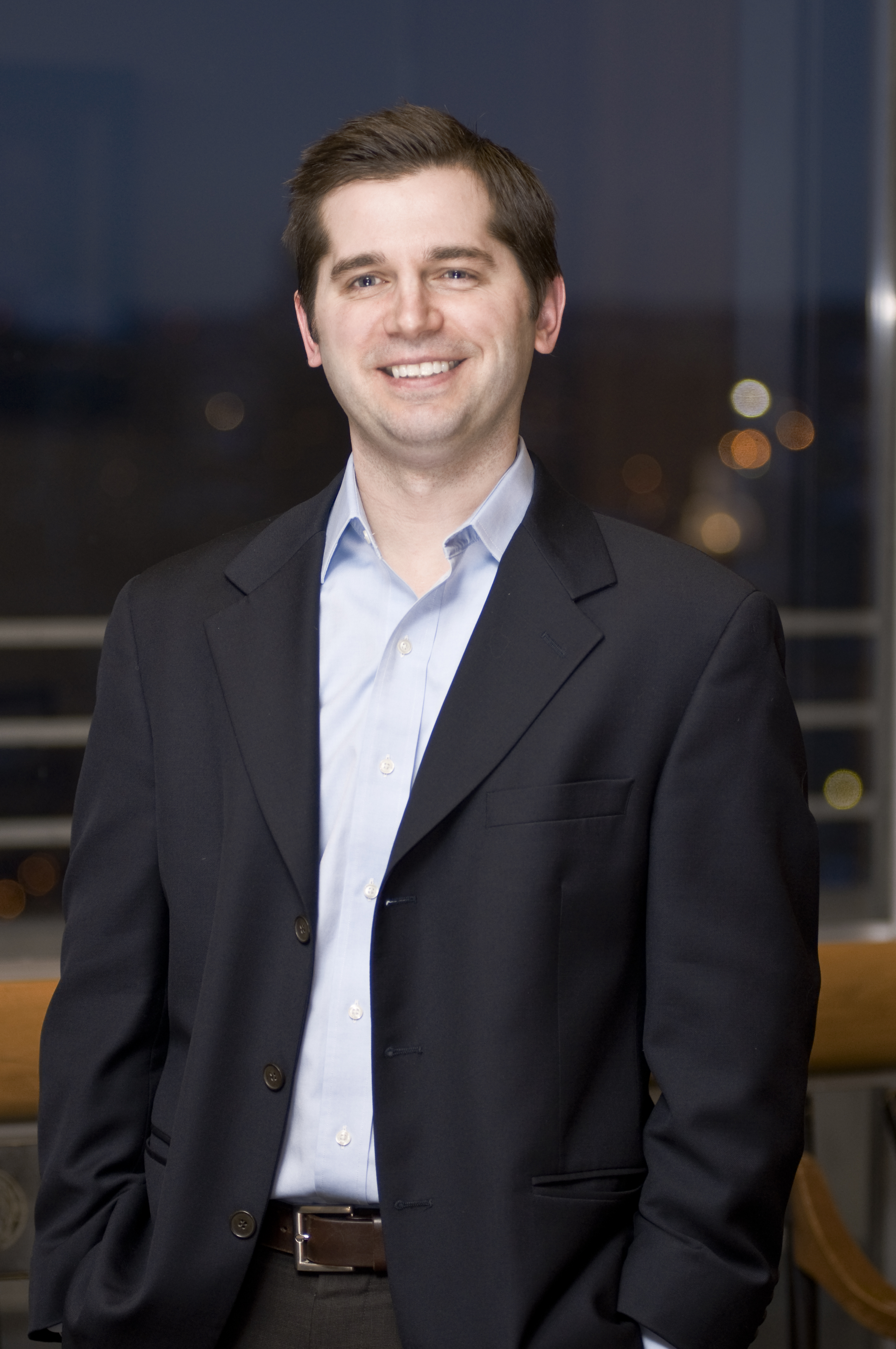
- Education: Boston University, Yale University
- Awards: MacArthur Fellow
- Scientific career
- Fields: Clinical psychology
- Workplaces: Harvard University
- Doctoral advisor: Alan Kazdin

Matthew K. Nock is an American clinical psychologist, the Edgar Pierce Professor of Psychology, and the Director of the Laboratory for Clinical and Developmental Research at Harvard University. He was named a 2011 MacArthur Fellow, also known as the MacArthur "Genius Award".

== Life ==
Nock was born and raised in New Jersey. He graduated from Roselle Catholic High School, received a bachelor's degree from Boston University, two master's degrees and a PhD in psychology from Yale University, and completed a clinical psychology internship at Bellevue Hospital Center and NYU Child Study Center. He currently is the Edgar Pierce Professor of Psychology and Director of the Nock Lab in the Department of Psychology at Harvard University.
