= Jill M. Hooley =

British psychologist

Jill M. Hooley is a professor of psychology at Harvard University. She is currently the head of the experimental psychopathology and clinical psychology program at Harvard. In 2009, she was the president of the Society for Research in Psychopathology.

== History ==
Hooley was born in England, she studied a B.Sc. in psychology from the University of Liverpool, She also attended Magdalen College, Oxford, from there she completed her D.Phil. Hooley has been a faculty member since 1985.

== Research ==
Together with Joseph Franklin, she developed a conceptual model of non-suicidal self-injury (NSSI).

== Awards and honors ==
- Fellow, Association for Psychological Science
- 2015 – Joseph Zubin Award, Society for Research in Psychopathology

== Books ==
- Hooley, Jill M. (2017). Abnormal psychology. James Neal Butcher, Matthew Nock, Susan Mineka (Seventeenth ed.). Boston. ISBN 978-0-13-385205-9. OCLC 927141335.

== Publications ==
- Predictors of relapse in unipolar depressives: expressed emotion, marital distress, and perceived criticism
- Hooley, J. M.; Orley, J.; Teasdale, J. D. (June 1986). "Levels of expressed emotion and relapse in depressed patients". The British Journal of Psychiatry: The Journal of Mental Science. 148 (6): 642–647. doi:10.1192/bjp.148.6.642. ISSN 0007-1250. PMID 3779242. S2CID 9832038.
- Hooley, Jill M. (2007-04-01). "Expressed Emotion and Relapse of Psychopathology". Annual Review of Clinical Psychology. 3 (1): 329–352. doi:10.1146/annurev.clinpsy.2.022305.095236. ISSN 1548-5943. PMID 17716059.
- Attributions and expressed emotion: A review
- Expressed emotion: A review of the critical literature
