= George Armitage Miller =

American psychologist (1920–2012)

- Born: February 3, 1920; Charleston, West Virginia, US
- Died: July 22, 2012 (aged 92); Plainsboro, New Jersey, US
- Education: George Washington University; University of Alabama (BA, MA); Harvard University (MA, PhD)
- Known for: "The Magical Number Seven, Plus or Minus Two"; Directing WordNet
- Awards: National Medal of Science (1991); Louis E. Levy Medal (1991); APA Award for Lifetime Contributions to Psychology (2003)
- Scientific career
- Fields: Psychology, cognitive science
- Workplaces: Princeton University; Harvard University; Massachusetts Institute of Technology; Rockefeller University; Oxford University; University of Alabama; American Psychological Association
- Thesis: Optimal Design of Jamming Signals (1946)
- Doctoral advisor: Stanley Smith Stevens
- Notable students: George Sperling, Ulric Neisser

George Armitage Miller (February 3, 1920 – July 22, 2012) was an American psychologist who was one of the founders of cognitive psychology, and more broadly, of cognitive science. He also contributed to the birth of psycholinguistics.

Miller wrote several books and directed the development of WordNet, an online word-linkage database usable by computer programs. He authored the paper, "The Magical Number Seven, Plus or Minus Two," in which he observed that many different experimental findings considered together reveal the presence of an average limit of seven for human short-term memory capacity. This paper is frequently cited by psychologists and in the wider culture. Miller won numerous awards, including the National Medal of Science.

Miller began his career when the reigning theory in psychology was behaviorism, which eschewed the study of mental processes and focused on observable behavior. Rejecting this approach, Miller devised experimental techniques and mathematical methods to analyze mental processes, focusing particularly on speech and language. Working mostly at Harvard University, MIT and Princeton University, he went on to become one of the founders of psycholinguistics and was one of the key figures in founding the broader new field of cognitive science, c. 1978. He collaborated and co-authored work with other figures in cognitive science and psycholinguistics, such as Noam Chomsky. For moving psychology into the realm of mental processes and for aligning that move with information theory, computation theory, and linguistics, Miller is considered one of the great twentieth-century psychologists. A Review of General Psychology survey, published in 2002, ranked Miller as the 20th most cited psychologist of that era.

== Biography ==
=== Early life and education ===
Miller was born on February 3, 1920, in Charleston, West Virginia, the son of George E. Miller, a steel company executive and Florence (née Armitage) Miller. Soon after his birth, his parents divorced, and he lived with his mother during the Great Depression, attending public school and graduating from Charleston High School in 1937. He moved with his mother and stepfather to Washington, D.C., and attended George Washington University for a year. His family practiced Christian Science, which required turning to prayer, rather than medical science, for healing. After his stepfather was transferred to Birmingham, Alabama, Miller transferred to the University of Alabama.

Miller received a Bachelor of Arts with a major in history and speech in 1940 and a Master of Arts in speech in 1941 from the University of Alabama. He received a Master of Arts in psychology in 1944 and a Doctor of Philosophy in psychology in 1946 from Harvard University.

When he was at the University of Alabama, membership in the Drama club had fostered his interest in courses in the Speech Department. He was also influenced by Professor Donald Ramsdell, who introduced him to psychology. Later, as a graduate student at Harvard University, he worked in Psycho-Acoustic Laboratory, under the supervision of Stanley Smith Stevens, researching military voice communications for the Army Signal Corps during World War II. He received his doctorate in 1946; his doctoral thesis, "The Optimal Design of Jamming Signals," was classified top secret by the US Army.

=== Career ===
After receiving his doctorate, Miller stayed at Harvard as a research fellow, continuing his research on speech and hearing. He was appointed an assistant professor of psychology in 1948. The course he developed on language and communication eventually led to his first major book, Language and communication (1951). He took a sabbatical in 1950, and spent a year as a visiting fellow at the Institute for Advanced Study, Princeton, to pursue his interest in mathematics. Miller befriended J. Robert Oppenheimer, with whom he played squash. In 1951, Miller joined MIT as an associate professor of psychology. He led the psychology group at the MIT Lincoln Lab and worked on voice communication and human engineering. A notable outcome of this research was his identification of the minimal voice features of speech required for it to be intelligible. Based on this work, in 1955, he was invited to talk at the Eastern Psychological Association. That presentation, "The magical number seven, plus or minus two", was later published as a paper which went on to be a legendary one in cognitive psychology.

Miller moved back to Harvard as a tenured associate professor in 1955 and became a full professor in 1958, expanding his research into how language affects human cognition. At the university, he met a young Noam Chomsky, another of the founders of cognitive science. They spent a summer together at Stanford, where their two families shared a house. In 1958–59, Miller took leave to join the Center for Advanced Study in the Behavioral Sciences at Palo Alto, California, (now at Stanford University). There he collaborated with Eugene Galanter and Karl Pribram on the book Plans and the Structure of Behavior. In 1960, along with Jerome S. Bruner, he co-founded the Center for Cognitive Studies at Harvard. The cognitive term was a break from the then-dominant school of behaviorism, which insisted cognition was not fit for scientific study. The center attracted such notable visitors as Jean Piaget, Alexander Luria and Chomsky. Miller then became the chair of the psychology department. Miller was instrumental at the time for recruiting Timothy Leary to teach at Harvard. Miller knew Leary from the University of Alabama, where Miller was teaching psychology and Leary graduated with an undergraduate degree from the department.

In 1967, Miller taught at Rockefeller University for a year, as a visiting professor, From 1968 to 1979, he was Professor at the Rockefeller and continued as adjunct professor there from 1979 to 1982. Following the election of a new president at Rockefeller Miller moved to Princeton University as the James S. McDonnell Distinguished University Professor of Psychology. At Princeton he helped to found (in 1986) the Cognitive Science Laboratory, and also directed the McDonnell-Pew Program in Cognitive Science.. Eventually, he became a professor emeritus and senior research psychologist at Princeton.

=== Death ===
He died in 2012 at his home in Plainsboro, New Jersey of complications of pneumonia and dementia. At the time of his death, he was survived by his wife Margaret; the children from his first marriage: son Donnally James and daughter Nancy Saunders; two stepsons, David Skutch and Christopher Skutch; and three grandchildren: Gavin Murray-Miller, Morgan Murray-Miller and Nathaniel James Miller.

== Academic research ==
=== Major contributions ===
Miller began his career in a period during which behaviorism dominated research psychology. It was argued that observable processes are the proper subject matter of science, that behavior is observable and mental processes are not. Thus, mental processes were not a fit topic for study. Miller disagreed. He and others such Jerome Bruner and Noam Chomsky founded the field of Cognitive Psychology, which accepted the study of mental processes as fundamental to an understanding of complex behavior. In succeeding years, this cognitive approach largely replaced behaviorism as the framework governing research in psychology.

==== Working memory ====
From the days of William James, psychologists had distinguished short-term from long-term memory. While short-term memory seemed to be limited, its limits were not known. In 1956, Miller put a number on that limit in the paper "The magical number seven, plus or minus two". He derived this number from tasks such as asking a person to repeat a set of digits, presenting a stimulus and a label and requiring recall of the label, or asking the person to quickly count things in a group. In all three cases, Miller found the average limit to be seven items. He later had mixed feelings about this work, feeling that it had often been misquoted, and he jokingly suggested that he was being persecuted by an integer. Miller invented the term chunk to characterize the way that individuals could cope with this limitation on memory, effectively reducing the number of elements by grouping them. A chunk might be a single letter or a familiar word or even a larger familiar unit. These and related ideas strongly influenced the budding field of cognitive psychology.

==== WordNet ====
For many years starting from 1986, Miller directed the development of WordNet, a large computer-readable electronic reference usable in applications such as search engines, which was created by a team that included Christiane Fellbaum, among others. Wordnet is a large lexical database representing human semantic memory in English. Its fundamental building block is a synset, which is a collection of synonyms representing a concept or idea. Words can be in multiple synsets. The entire class of synsets is grouped into nouns, verbs, adjectives and adverbs separately, with links existing only within these four major groups but not between them. Going beyond a thesaurus, WordNet also includes inter-word relationships such as part/whole relationships and hierarchies of inclusion.Although not intended to be a dictionary, Wordnet did have many short definitions added to it as time went on. Miller and colleagues had planned the tool to test psycholinguistic theories on how humans use and understand words. Miller also later worked closely with entrepreneur Jeff Stibel and scientists at Simpli.com Inc., on a meaning-based keyword search engine based on WordNet. Wordnet has proved to be extremely influential on an international scale. It has now been emulated by wordnets in many different languages.

==== Psychology of language ====
Miller is one of the founders of psycholinguistics, which links language and cognition in the analysis of language creation and usage. His 1951 book Language and Communication is considered seminal in the field. His later book, The Science of Words (1991) also focused on the psychology of language. Together with Noam Chomsky he published papers on the mathematical and computational aspects of language and its syntax, two new areas of study. Miller also studied the human understanding of words and sentences, a problem also faced by artificial speech-recognition technology. The book Plans and the Structure of Behavior (1960), written with Eugene Galanter and Karl H. Pribram, explored how humans plan and act, trying to extrapolate this to how a robot could be programmed to plan and act. Miller is also known for coining Miller's Law: "In order to understand what another person is saying, you must assume it is true and try to imagine what it could be true of".

=== Published books ===
Miller authored several books, many considered the first major works in their respective fields.

==== Language and Communication, 1951 ====
Miller's Language and Communication was one of the first significant texts in the study of language behavior. The book was a scientific study of language, emphasizing quantitative data, and was based on the mathematical model of Claude Shannon's information theory. It used a probabilistic model imposed on a learning-by-association scheme borrowed from behaviorism, with Miller not yet attached to a pure cognitive perspective. The first part of the book reviewed information theory, the physiology and acoustics of phonetics, speech recognition and comprehension, and statistical techniques to analyze language. The focus was more on speech generation than recognition. The second part had the psychology: idiosyncratic differences across people in language use; developmental linguistics; the structure of word associations in people; use of symbolism in language; and social aspects of language use.

Reviewing the book, Charles E. Osgood classified the book as a graduate-level text based more on objective facts than on theoretical constructs. He thought the book was verbose on some topics and too brief on others not directly related to the author's expertise area. He was also critical of Miller's use of simple, Skinnerian single-stage stimulus-response learning to explain human language acquisition and use. This approach, per Osgood, made it impossible to analyze the concept of meaning, and the idea of language consisting of representational signs. He did find the book objective in its emphasis on facts over theory, and depicting clearly application of information theory to psychology.

==== Plans and the Structure of Behavior, 1960 ====
In Plans and the Structure of Behavior, Miller and his co-authors tried to explain through an artificial-intelligence computational perspective how animals plan and act. This was a radical break from behaviorism which explained behavior as a set or sequence of stimulus-response actions. The authors introduced a planning element controlling such actions. They saw all plans as being executed based on input using a stored or inherited information of the environment (called the image), and using a strategy called test-operate-test-exit (TOTE). The image was essentially a stored memory of all past context, akin to Tolman's cognitive map. The TOTE strategy, in its initial test phase, compared the input against the image; if there was incongruity the operate function attempted to reduce it. This cycle would be repeated till the incongruity vanished, and then the exit function would be invoked, passing control to another TOTE unit in a hierarchically arranged scheme.

Peter Milner, in a review in the Canadian Journal of Psychology, noted the book was short on concrete details on implementing the TOTE strategy. He also critically viewed the book as not being able to tie its model to details from neurophysiology at a molecular level. Per him, the book covered only the brain at the gross level of lesion studies, showing that some of its regions could possibly implement some TOTE strategies, without giving a reader an indication as to how the region could implement the strategy.

==== The Psychology of Communication, 1967 ====
Miller's 1967 work, The Psychology of Communication, was a collection of seven previously published articles. The first "Information and Memory" dealt with chunking, presenting the idea of separating physical length (the number of items presented to be learned) and psychological length (the number of ideas the recipient manages to categorize and summarize the items with). Capacity of short-term memory was measured in units of psychological length, arguing against a pure behaviorist interpretation since meaning of items, beyond reinforcement and punishment, was central to psychological length.

The second essay was the paper on magical number seven. The third, 'The human link in communication systems,' used information theory and its idea of channel capacity to analyze human perception bandwidth. The essay concluded how much of what impinges on us we can absorb as knowledge was limited, for each property of the stimulus, to a handful of items. The paper on "Psycholinguists" described how effort in both speaking or understanding a sentence was related to how much of self-reference to similar-structures-present-inside was there when the sentence was broken down into clauses and phrases. The book, in general, used the Chomskian view of seeing language rules of grammar as having a biological basis—disproving the simple behaviorist idea that language performance improved with reinforcement—and using the tools of information and computation to place hypotheses on a sound theoretical framework and to analyze data practically and efficiently. Miller specifically addressed experimental data refuting the behaviorist framework at concept level in the field of language and cognition. He noted this only qualified behaviorism at the level of cognition, and did not overthrow it in other spheres of psychology.

== Honors ==
Miller had honorary doctorates from the University of Sussex (1984), Columbia University (1980), Yale University (1979), Catholic University of Louvain (1978), Carnegie Mellon University (in humane letters, 2003), and an honorary DSC from Williams College (2000). He was elected to the American Academy of Arts and Sciences in 1957, the National Academy of Sciences in 1962, the presidency of the Eastern Psychological Association in 1962, the presidency of the American Psychological Association in 1969, the American Philosophical Society in 1971, and to the Royal Netherlands Academy of Arts and Sciences in 1985. Miller was the keynote speaker at the first convention of the Association for Psychological Science in 1989. He was a Fulbright research fellow at Oxford University in 1964–65, and in 1991, received the National Medal of Science.

The Cognitive Neuroscience Society established a George A. Miller Prize in 1995 for contributions to the field. The American Psychological Association established a George A. Miller Award in 1995 for an outstanding article on general psychology. From 1987 the department of psychology at Princeton University has presented the George A. Miller prize annually to the best interdisciplinary senior thesis in cognitive science. The paper on the magical number seven continues to be cited by both the popular press to explain the liking for seven-digit phone numbers and to argue against nine-digit zip codes, and by academia, especially modern psychology, to highlight its break with the behaviorist paradigm.

Miller was considered the 20th most eminent psychologist of the 20th century in a list republished by, among others, the American Psychological Association.

== Personal life ==
Miller met his future wife Katherine James at a seminar held by Professor Donald Ramsdell at the University of Alabama. They married on November 29, 1939. Katherine died in January 1996. Miller married Margaret Ferguson Skutch Page in 2008.

== Awards ==
- Distinguished Scientific Contribution award from the American Psychological Association (APA) in 1963.
- Distinguished Service award from the American Speech and Hearing Association, 1976.
- Award in Behavioral Sciences from the New York Academy of Sciences, 1982.
- Guggenheim fellow in 1986.
- William James fellow of the American Psychological Society, 1989.
- Hermann von Helmholtz award from the Cognitive Neurosciences Institute, 1989.
- Gold Medal from the American Psychological Foundation in 1990.
- National Medal of Science from The White House, 1991.
- Louis E. Levy medal from the Franklin Institute, 1991.
- International Prize from the Fyssen Foundation, 1992.
- William James Book award from the APA Division of General Psychology, 1993.
- John P. McGovern award from the American Association for the Advancement of Science, 2000.
- Outstanding Lifetime Contribution to Psychology award from the APA in 2003.
- Antonio Zampolli Prize from the European Languages Research Association, 2006.

== Works ==
- George A. Miller; Eugene Galanter; Karl H. Pribram (1960). Plans and the Structure of Behavior. Henry Holt & Co. ISBN 978-0-03-010075-8.
- George A. Miller (1962). Psychology: The Science of Mental Life. Harper & Row.
- — (1963). Language and Communication. McGraw Hill. ASIN B000SRSOIK.
- — (1965). Mathematics and Psychology (Perspectives in Psychology). John Wiley & Sons. ISBN 978-0-471-60408-2.
- Frank Smith; George A. Miller, eds. (1966). The genesis of language; a psycholinguistic approach; proceedings of a conference on language development in children. The MIT Press.
- Frank Smith; George A Miller (1968). The Genesis of Language: A Psycholinguistic Approach. The MIT Press. ISBN 978-0-262-69022-5.
- George A. Miller, ed. (1973). Communication, Language and Meaning (Perspectives in Psychology). Basic Books. ISBN 978-0-465-12833-4.
- — (1974). Linguistic Communication: Perspectives for Research. International Reading Association. ISBN 978-0-87207-929-8.
- — (1975). The Psychology of Communication. Harper Androw-1975. ISBN 978-0-465-09707-4.
- George A. Miller; Philip N Johnson-Laird (1976). Language and Perception. Harvard University Press. ISBN 978-0-674-50947-4.
- Morris Halle; Joan Bresnan; George A. Miller, eds. (1978). Linguistic theory and psychological reality. The MIT Press. ISBN 978-0-262-08095-8.
- George A. Miller; Elizabeth Lenneberg, eds. (1978). Psychology and biology of language and thought: essays in honor of Eric Lenneberg. Academic Press. ISBN 978-0-12-497750-1.
- Oscar Grusky; George A. Miller, eds. (1981). Sociology of Organizations (2nd ed.). Free Press. ISBN 978-0-02-912930-2.
- Ned Joel Block; Jerrold J. Katz; George A. Miller, eds. (1981). Readings in Philosophy of Psychology, Volume II. Harvard University Press. ISBN 978-0-674-74878-1.
- George A. Miller; Eugene Galanter; Karl H. Pribram (1986). Plans and the Structure of Behavior. Adams Bannister Cox Pubs. ISBN 978-0-937431-00-9.
- — (1987). Spontaneous Apprentices: Children and Language (Tree of Life). Seabury Press. ISBN 978-0-8164-9330-2.
- — (1987). Language and Speech. W H Freeman & Co (sd). ISBN 978-0-7167-1297-8.
- — (1991). The Science of Words. W H Freeman & Co. ISBN 978-0-7167-5027-7.

=== Chapters in books ===
- Miller, George A.; Galanter, Eugene (1960), "Some comments on Stochastic models and psychological theories", in Arrow, Kenneth J.; Karlin, Samuel; Suppes, Patrick (eds.), Mathematical models in the social sciences, 1959: Proceedings of the first Stanford symposium, Stanford mathematical studies in the social sciences, IV, Stanford, California: Stanford University Press, pp. 277–297, ISBN 978-0-8047-0021-4.
