= Steve Reiss =

American producer

- Born: August 28, 1958 (age 68); Forest Hills, New York
- Known for: Producer, publisher, ocean activist
- Website: www.stevereiss.com/bio/

Steve Reiss (born August 28, 1958) is a Grammy-nominated producer, entrepreneur, author and ocean activist.

== Early life ==
Reiss was born on August 28, 1958, in Forest Hills, New York and raised in Manhattan and Bridgehampton, New York. He studied Marine Science at the University of Miami and Marine Biology at UC San Diego, graduating with a degree in Visual Arts.

== Career ==
Reiss has worked for NBC Productions, Propaganda Films and Satellite Films, Digital Domain, Speedshape Los Angeles, Sea Level VFX, and Copa. Between 1998 and 2008 he worked with Partizan, Anonymous Content, Spot Welders and Speedshape on advertising campaigns for the Gap, Lexus Dark Ride, BMW, Nike and Air France. Reiss has worked with Mark Romanek, Peter Care, Michel Gondry, Spike Jonze, Phil Joanou, Michael Bay and has produced music videos for Michael Jackson—who taught him the "moonwalk" during their shoot—The Breeders, and Lauryn Hill.

Reiss was credited as a co-producer for R.E.M.'s Road Movie for Warner Bros. in 1996, and produced and packaged the books Mark Romanek: Music Video Stills in 1999 and Thirty Frames Per Second: The Visionary Art of the Music Video with writer and editor Neil Feineman in 2000. Thirty Frames Per Second chronicles the history of music videos and their influence on pop culture, sports, advertising and fashion and was positively reviewed by LA Weekly. Still shots from music videos were converted from low resolution frame stills into high resolution digital imagery for printing.

== Activism ==
Reiss is a surfer and environmental activist for the preservation of clean water and the oceans. He is an advisor for the Catapulta Fest in Oaxaca, Mexico, and has done fundraising and outreach for Heal the Bay. Reiss is also the strategic advisor for SustainableSurf.org, an ocean advocacy organization for surfers. He consults for the Buckminster Fuller Institute and is an advisor to the Florence Belsky Charitable Foundation.

== Publications and book packaging ==
- Mark Romanek: Music Video Stills (1999)
- Thirty Frames Per Second: The Visionary Art of the Music Video (2000)
- A + R (2006–2007)
- Leonard Cohen (2015)
- The Beatles Help (2016)

== Producer credits ==
=== Television ===
- P.S. I Luv U (1991)
- In a Heartbeat (2000)
- "In Search of Stone" – pilot (2010)

=== Film and DVD ===
- "Cindy Crawford Shape Your Body Workout" – Satellite Films (1992)
- "One West Waikiki" TV Series – CBS Television and Rysher Entertainment (1994)
- "RoadMovie a.k.a. R.E.M.: Road Movie" – Warner Bros Music (1996)
- "Inside Sessions – The Writers Process: from Concept to Publication" (2001)
- "Inside Sessions – The Music Business: An Insider's Guide to Breaking In" (2001)
- "The Work of Director Mark Romanek" – DVD series and documentary (2005)
- "Beloved" – short film (2009)

=== Music videos ===
- The Breeders – "Cannonball" (1993)
- Michael Jackson – "History Re-Mix" (1997)
- Lauryn Hill – "Everything Is Everything" (1999)
- YouthAIDS and Luxe Media Group and Timbaland – "What More Can I Give" (2003)
- Coldplay and Rihanna – "Princess of China" (2012) Executive Producer for Copa

== Post-producer and visual effects supervisor credits ==
=== Music videos ===
- Michael Jackson – "Jam" and "Jam" promos (1991)
- David Bowie – "Black Tie, White Noise" (1992)
- David Bowie – "Jump They Say" (1992)
- Madonna – "Deeper and Deeper" (1992)
- U2 – "Who's Gonna Ride Your Wild Horses" (1992)
- Bruce Hornsby – "Harbor Lights" (1993)
- Lenny Kravitz – "Are You Gonna Go My Way" (1993)
- Madonna – "Rain" (1993)
- Lenny Kravitz – "Circus" (1995)
- Alanis Morissette – "Head over Feet" (1995)
- Paula Abdul – "Ain't Never Gonna Give You Up" (1996)
- Luscious Jackson – "Naked Eye" (1996)
- R.E.M. – "Electrolite" (1996)
- Aerosmith – "Falling in Love Is Hard on the Knees" (1997)
- Janet Jackson – "Together Again" (1997)
- Gloria Estefan – "Heaven's What I Feel" (1998)

== Awards and nominations ==
=== Music videos ===
- 1993 MTV Video Music Awards – Nominated Best Alternative Video – The Breeders: "Cannonball"
- 2000 Grammy Awards – Nominated for Best R&B Video – Lauryn Hill: "Everything is Everything"

=== Commercials ===
- 1996 New York Festivals Advertising Television Award– PSA Campaign– SF MoMa: Keith Haring Retrospective "Graffiti Dog"
- 1993 CFDA Award “Chrome Hearts” directed by Spike Jonze
