= Information processing theory =

Approach to the study of cognitive development

Information processing theory is the approach to the study of cognitive development evolved out of the American experimental tradition in psychology. Developmental psychologists who adopt the information processing perspective account for mental development in terms of maturational changes in basic components of a child's mind. The theory is based on the idea that humans process the information they receive, rather than merely responding to stimuli. This perspective uses an analogy to consider how the mind works like a computer. In this way, the mind functions like a biological computer responsible for analyzing information from the environment. According to the standard information-processing model for mental development, the mind's machinery includes attention mechanisms for bringing information in, working memory for actively manipulating information, and long-term memory for passively holding information so that it can be used in the future. This theory addresses how as children grow, their brains likewise mature, leading to advances in their ability to process and respond to the information they received through their senses. The theory emphasizes a continuous pattern of development, in contrast with cognitive-developmental theorists such as Jean Piaget's theory of cognitive development that thought development occurs in stages at a time.

== Humans as information processing systems ==
The information processing theory simplified is comparing the human brain to a computer or basic processor. It is theorized that the brain works in a set sequence, as does a computer. The sequence goes as follows, "receives input, processes the information, and delivers an output".

This theory suggests that we as humans will process information in a similar way. Like a computer receives input the mind will receive information through the senses. If the information is focused on, it will move to the short-term memory. While in the short-term memory or working memory, the mind is able to use the information to address its surroundings. The information is then encoded to the long-term memory, where the information is then stored. The information can be retrieved when necessary using the central executive. The central executive can be understood as the conscious mind. The central executive can pull information from the long-term memory back to the working memory for its use. As a computer processes information, this is how it is thought our minds are processing information. The output that a computer would deliver can be likened to the mind's output of information through behavior or action.

== Components ==
Though information processing can be compared to a computer, there is much more that needs to be explained. Information processing has several components. The major components are information stores, cognitive processes, and executive cognition.

Information stores are the different places that information can be stored in the mind. Information is stored briefly in the sensory memory. This information is stored just long enough for us to move the information to the short-term memory. George Armitage Miller discovered the short-term memory can only hold 7 (plus or minus two) things at once. The information here is also stored for only 15–20 seconds. The information stored in the short-term memory can be committed to the long-term memory store. There is no limit to the information stored in the long-term memory. The information stored here can stay for many years. Long-term memory can be divided between semantic, episodic, and procedural memories. Semantic memory is made up of facts or information learned or obtained throughout life. Episodic memory concerns personal experiences or real events that have happened in a person's life. Lastly, procedural memory is made up of procedures or processes learned such as riding a bike. Each of these are subcategories of long-term memory.

Cognitive processes are the way humans transfer information among the different memory stores. Some prominent processes used in transferring information are coding, retrieval, and perception. Coding is the process of transferring information from the short to long-term memory by relating the information of the long-term memory to the item in the short-term memory. This can be done through memorization techniques. Retrieval is used to bring information from the long-term memory back to the short-term memory. This can be achieved through many different recall techniques. Perception is the use of the information processed to interpret the environment. Another useful technique advised by George Miller is recoding. Recoding is the process of regrouping or organizing the information the mind is working with. A successful method of recoding is chunking. Chunking is used to group together pieces of information. Each unit of information is considered a chunk, this could be one or several words. This is commonly used when trying to memorize a phone number.

Executive cognition is the idea that someone is aware of the way they process information. They know their strengths and weaknesses. This concept is similar to metacognition. The conscious mind has control over the processes of the information processing theory.

== Emergence ==
Information processing as a model for human thinking and learning is part of the resurgence of cognitive perspectives of learning. The cognitive perspective asserts that complex mental states affect human learning and behavior that such mental states can be scientifically investigated. Computers, which process information, include internal states that affect processing. Computers, therefore, provided a model for possible human mental states that provided researchers with clues and direction for understanding human thinking and learning as information processing. Overall, information-processing models helped reestablish mental processes—processes that cannot be directly observed—as a legitimate area of scientific research.

== Major theorists ==
George Armitage Miller was one of the founders of the field of psychology known as cognition. He played a large role when it came to the information processing theory. He researched the capacity of the working memory, discovering that people can only hold up to 7 plus or minus 2 items. He also created the term chunking when explaining how to make the most of our short-term memory.

Two other theorists associated with the cognitive information processing theory are Richard C. Atkinson and Richard Shiffrin. In 1968 these two proposed a multi-stage theory of memory. They explained that from the time information is received by the processing system, it goes through different stages to be fully stored. They broke this down to sensory memory, short-term memory, and long-term memory (Atkinson).

Later in 1974 Alan Baddeley and Graham Hitch would contribute more to the information processing theory through their own discoveries. They deepened the understanding of memory through the central executive, phonological loop, and visuospatial sketch pad. Baddeley later updated his model with the episodic buffer.

== Atkinson and Shiffrin model ==
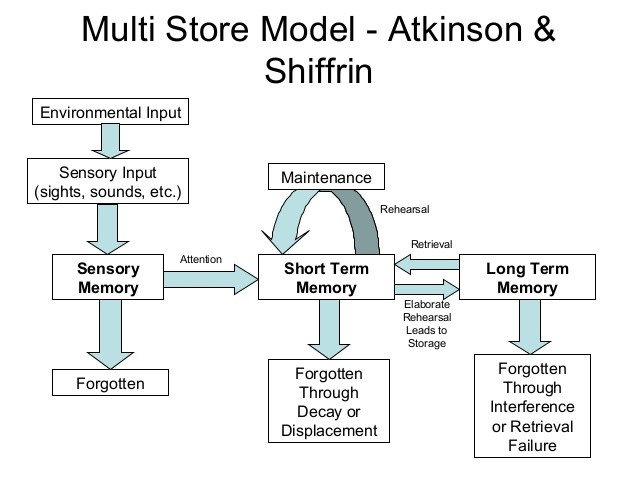

The Atkinson–Shiffrin memory model was proposed in 1968 by Richard C. Atkinson and Richard Shiffrin. This model illustrates their theory of the human memory. These two theorists used this model to show that the human memory can be broken in to three sub-sections: Sensory Memory, short-term memory and long-term memory.

=== Sensory memory ===
The sensory memory is responsible for holding onto information that the mind receives through the senses such as haptic, auditory and visual information. For example, if someone were to hear a bird chirp, they know that it is a bird because that information is held in the brief sensory memory. That is, through our senses

=== Short-term memory ===
Short-term memory lasts for about 30 seconds. Short-term memory retains information that is needed for only a short period of time such as remembering a phone number that needs to be dialed.

=== Long-term memory ===
The long-term memory has an unlimited amount of space. In the long-term memory, there can be memory stored in there from the beginning of our life time. The long-term memory is tapped into when there is a need to recall an event that happened in an individual's previous experiences.

== Baddeley and Hitch model of working memory ==
Baddeley and Hitch introduced the model of working memory in 1974. Through their research, they contributed more to help understand how the mind may process information. They added three elements that explain further cognitive processes. These elements are the central executive, phonological loop, and the visuo-spatial working memory. Later Alan Baddeley added a fourth element to the working memory model called the episodic buffer. Together these ideas support the information processing theory and possibly explain how the mind processes information.

The Working Memory Model (Baddeley and Hitch, 1974, revised-2000)

=== Central executive ===
The central executive is a flexible system responsible for the control and regulation of cognitive processes. It directs focus and targets information, making working memory and long-term memory work together. It can be thought of as a supervisory system that controls cognitive processes, making sure the short-term store is actively working, and intervenes when they go astray and prevents distractions.

It has the following functions:

- Updating and coding incoming information and replacing old information
- Binding information from a number of sources into coherent episodes
- Coordination of the subsystems
- Shifting between tasks or retrieval strategies
- Inhibition, suppressing dominant or automatic responses
- Selective attention

The central executive has two main systems: the visuo-spatial sketchpad, for visual information, and the phonological loop, for verbal information.

Using the dual-task paradigm, Baddeley and Della Salla have found, for instance, that patients with Alzheimer's dementia are impaired when performing multiple tasks simultaneously, even when the difficulty of the individual tasks is adapted to their abilities. Two tasks include a memory tasks and a tracking task. Individual actions are completed well, but as the Alzheimer's becomes more prominent in a patient, performing two or more actions becomes more and more difficult. This research has shown the deteriorating of the central executive in individuals with Alzheimer's.

Recent research on executive functions suggests that the 'central' executive is not as central as conceived in the Baddeley & Hitch model. Rather, there seem to be separate executive functions that can vary largely independently between individuals and can be selectively impaired or spared by brain damage.

=== Phonological loop ===
Working in connection with the central executive is the phonological loop. The phonological loop is used to hold auditory information. There are two sub components of the phonological loop; the phonological store and the articulatory rehearsal process. The phonological store holds auditory information for a short period. The articulatory rehearsal process keeps the information in the store for a longer period of time through rehearsal.

=== Visuospatial sketch pad ===
The visuospatial sketch pad is the other portion of the central executive. This is used to hold visual and spatial information. The visuospatial sketch pad is used to help the conscious imagine objects as well as maneuver through the physical environment.

=== Episodic buffer ===
Baddeley later added a fourth aspect to the model called the episodic buffer. It is proposed that the episodic buffer is able to hold information thereby increasing the amount stored. Due to the ability to hold information the episodic buffer is said to also transfer information between perception, short-term memory and long-term memory. The episodic buffer is a relatively new idea and is still being researched.

== The Erlangen School of Information Psychology ==
The key insight of the Erlangen School of Information Psychology builds upon Helmar Frank's 1960 psychostructural model of human information processing, according to which information from the environment can enter the short-term memory ("working memory") via the sensory organs. What enters this memory becomes conscious and can be further processed, stored in memory, or planned as an action and then acted upon in relation to the environment.

As soon as the information received and the information to be managed exceeds the short-term memory capacity, the information processing process breaks down and must be restarted. Since individuals differ in their short-term memory capacity, they exhibit varying levels of information processing performance, which is considered the basis of "general intelligence" and is reflected in the individual general factor of intelligence. In particular, the level of fluid intelligence depends on this.

The capacity of short-term memory C (measured in bits) depends, according to the equation:

C = S ⋅ D on the quantities

- information processing speed S (measured in bits per second) and
- present-moment duration D (measured in seconds; roughly equivalent to memory span or recall span).

In addition to the concept presented, the Erlangen School developed the easily administerable intelligence test KAI for single and repeated administration, including a self-test version, later named the Short Test for General Basic Quantities of Information Processing (KAI), which measures information processing speed as reading speed. With the KAI, S and D can be measured in a few minutes, from which the short-term memory capacity can then be determined using the equation above. These values can also be assigned to IQ points.

== Other cognitive processes ==
Cognitive processes include perception, recognition, imagining, remembering, thinking, judging, reasoning, problem solving, conceptualizing, and planning. These cognitive processes can emerge from human language, thought, imagery, and symbols.

In addition to these specific cognitive processes, many cognitive psychologists study language-acquisition, altered states of mind and consciousness, visual perception, auditory perception, short-term memory, long-term memory, storage, retrieval, perceptions of thought and much more.

Cognitive processes emerge through senses, thoughts, and experiences. The first step is aroused by paying attention, it allows processing of the information given. Cognitive processing cannot occur without learning, they work hand in hand to fully grasp the information.

== Nature versus nurture ==
Nature versus nurture refers to the theory about how people are influenced. The nature mentality is around the idea that we are influenced by our genetics. This involves all of our physical characteristics and our personality. On the other hand, nurture revolves around the idea that we are influenced by the environment and our experiences. Some believe that we are the way we are due to how we were raised, in what type of environment we were raised in and our early childhood experiences. This theory views humans as actively inputting, retrieving, processing, and storing information. Context, social content, and social influences on processing are simply viewed as information. Nature provides the hardware of cognitive processing and Information Processing theory explains cognitive functioning based on that hardware. Individuals innately vary in some cognitive abilities, such a memory span, but human cognitive systems function similarly based on a set of memory stores that store information and control processes determine how information is processed. The “Nurture” component provides information input (stimuli) that is processed resulting in behavior and learning. Changes in the contents of the long-term memory store (knowledge) are learning. Prior knowledge affects future processing and thus affects future behavior and learning.

== Quantitative versus qualitative ==
Information processing theory combines elements of both quantitative and qualitative development. Qualitative development occurs through the emergence of new strategies for information storage and retrieval, developing representational abilities (such as the utilization of language to represent concepts), or obtaining problem-solving rules (Miller, 2011). Increases in the knowledge base or the ability to remember more items in working memory are examples of quantitative changes, as well as increases in the strength of connected cognitive associations (Miller, 2011). The qualitative and quantitative components often interact together to develop new and more efficient strategies within the processing system.

== Current areas of research ==
Information processing theory is currently being used in the study of computer or artificial intelligence. This theory has also been applied to systems beyond the individual, including families and business organizations. For example, Ariel (1987) applied information processing theory to family systems, with sensing, attending, and encoding of stimuli occurring either within individuals or within the family system itself. Unlike traditional systems theory, where the family system tends to maintain stasis and resists incoming stimuli which would violate the system's rules, the information processing family develops individual and mutual schemes which influence what and how information is attended to and processed. Dysfunctions can occur both at the individual level as well as within the family system itself, creating more targets for therapeutic change. Rogers, P. R. et al. (1999) utilized information processing theory to describe business organizational behavior, as well as to present a model describing how effective and ineffective business strategies are developed. In their study, components of organizations that "sense" market information are identified as well as how organizations attend to this information; which gatekeepers determine what information is relevant/important for the organization, how this is organized into the existing culture (organizational schemas), and whether or not the organization has effective or ineffective processes for their long-term strategy. Cognitive psychologists Kahnemen and Grabe noted that learners have some control over this process. Selective attention is the ability of humans to select and process certain information while simultaneously ignoring others. This is influenced by many things including:

- What the information being processed means to the individual
- The complexity of the stimuli (based partially on background knowledge)
- Ability to control attention (varies based on age, hyperactivity, etc.)

Some research has shown that individuals with a high working memory are better able to filter out irrelevant information. In particular, one study on focusing on dichotic listening, followed participants were played two audio tracks, one in each ear, and were asked to pay attention only to one. It was shown that there was a significant positive relationship between working memory capacity and ability of the participant to filter out the information from the other audio track.

== Implications for teaching ==
Some examples of classroom implications of the information processing theory include:

Method	Example
Use mnemonics to aid students in retaining information for later use, as well as strengthening the students' remembering skills.	While teaching the order of operations in mathematics, use the mnemonic "Please excuse my dear Aunt Sally" to symbolize the six steps.
When teaching a specific lesson, use many different teaching styles and tools.	In social studies, if the lesson is on the Rwandan genocide, lecture on the topic using many pictures, watch the movie Hotel Rwanda, and have a class discussion about the topic and the film.
Pair students together to review the material covered.	When teaching a more abstract lesson, place students into pairs and have each student teach their partner the material covered to further embed the information into long-term memory.
Break down lessons into smaller more manageable parts.	When teaching an intricate math equation, walk the students through an example step-by-step. After each step, pause for questions to ensure everyone understands.
Assess the extent of the prior knowledge students have about the upcoming material.	After each test, have a pre-test about the next chapter to get an understanding of how much prior knowledge the students have.
Give students feedback on each assignment as a reinforcement.	When returning a graded paper ensure there are both positive and negative comments on each paper. This will assist the students in bettering their future work, as well as keep them motivated in their studies.
Connect new lessons back to old lessons and real-life scenarios.	When teaching a lesson about the Industrial Revolution, tie it back to your own town and buildings or areas that exist because of that time period.
Allow for over-learning	Play games like Trivial Pursuit and Jeopardy! to encourage extra learning, especially as a review, within the classroom.
