= Donald Broadbent =

British psychologist (1928–2020)

Donald Eric Broadbent
- Born: May 6, 1926; Birmingham
- Died: April 10, 1993 (aged 66)
- Spouse(s): Margaret E. Wright; Margaret Gregory
- Children: 2

Academic background
- Education: University of Cambridge

Academic work
- Discipline: Experimental Psychology
- Institutions: Applied Psychology Research Unit
- Doctoral students: {{Plainlist|: Patrick Rabbitt; Graham Hitch; Zoltán Pál Dienes; Dylan M. Jones; Susan Gathercole; Paul Bertelson

Donald Eric (D. E.) Broadbent CBE, FRS (Birmingham, 6 May 1926 – 10 April 1993) was an influential experimental psychologist from the United Kingdom. His career and research bridged the gap between the pre-World War II approach of Sir Frederic Bartlett and what became known as cognitive psychology in the late 1960s. A Review of General Psychology survey, published in 2002, ranked Broadbent as the 54th most cited psychologist of the 20th century.

== Biography ==
Although born in Birmingham, Broadbent considered himself Welsh and spent considerable time in Wales during his youth. Despite family and financial circumstances, Broadbent's mother managed to send him to Winchester; she didn't ever want him to be disadvantaged compared to others with a superior education. He said of her aims to do this that "instead of getting me to the best schooling she could afford, she made up her mind with sublime arrogance as to which she thought was the best school in the country, and that was where I went: Winchester." His father was by then gone, though earlier he had been part of their lives, and even at times successful in the business he helped run. He lived after his father left in Llandyman and later Mold.

Before his military service, he struggled to find his niche in the realm of education after experimenting in the classics, history, and the physical sciences, of which his favorite was the sciences. During his time training in the United States however, he was exposed to a more widely accepted and studied field of psychology that piqued his interest. When he returned and attended Cambridge, he made this his field of study despite attempts to dissuade him by the admission committee. He studied experimental psychology under the guidance of Frederic Bartlett who was a pragmatic teacher focused on evidence before theory. Another, less direct influence on his education was Kenneth Craik, who—though recently passed away—had been and was extremely influential on the department. Upon graduating in 1949 he became a member of the Applied Psychology Unit at Cambridge.

Educated at the University of Cambridge, in 1958 he became director of the Applied Psychology Research Unit, set up by the UK Medical Research Council in 1944 to focus on Frederic Bartlett's work. Although most of the work at the APRU was directed at practical issues of the military or private industry, Broadbent became well known for his theoretical work. His theories of selective attention and short-term memory were developed as digital computers were becoming available to the academic community, and were among the first to use computer analogies to make serious contributions to the analysis of human cognition. These theories were combined to form what became known as the "single channel hypothesis." Broadbent's filter model of attention proposed that the physical characteristics (e.g., pitch, loudness) of an auditory message were used to focus attention to only a single message. Broadbent's filter model is referred to as an Early Selection Model because irrelevant messages are filtered out BEFORE the stimulus information is processed for meaning. These and other theories were brought together in his 1958 book Perception and Communication, which remains one of the classic texts of cognitive psychology. In 1974 Broadbent became a fellow of Wolfson College, Oxford and returned to applied science; along with his colleague Dianne Berry, he developed new ideas about implicit learning from consideration of human performance in complex industrial processes.

The Applied Psychology Unit was responsible for advising the government and he worked in studies with noise and technology. His work on attention stemmed out of his desire to develop better communication between squadron planes and control centers. He had begun this work previous to working at the Applied Psychology Unit while working for the Royal Navy, and eventually this focus led to the filter model of attention he is most famous for. He continued to visit the United States on occasion as part of his work.

In 1958 he published his most-cited work, the book Perception and Communication, and that same year he became the director of the Applied Psychology Unit and led it to become a world authority in applied psychology. His book changed the face of psychology and is attributed as a significant factor in the development of the field of cognitive psychology. In order to better pursue his personal research, he transferred to the Department of Experimental Psychology in Oxford in 1974. This is where he developed the CFQ—the Cognitive Failures Questionnaire—which examined effects of occupation on health, and continued his work on attention and memory.

He went on to publish Behaviour, Decision and Stress, and In Defence of Empirical Psychology as well as nearly 250 miscellaneous articles or commentaries. He died only two years after his retirement on 10 April 1993.

== Filter model of attention ==
Broadbent's filter model of attention proposes the existence of a theoretical filter device, located between the incoming sensory register, and the short-term memory storage. His theory is based on the multi-storage paradigm of William James (1890) and the more recent 'multi-store' memory model by Atkinson & Shiffrin in 1968. This filter functions together with a buffer, and enables the subject to handle two kinds of stimuli presented at the same time. One of the inputs is allowed through the filter, while the other waits in the buffer for later processing. The filter prevents the overloading of the limited-capacity mechanism located beyond the filter, which is the short-term memory. Broadbent came up with this theory based on data from an experiment: three pairs of different digits are presented simultaneously, one set of three digits in one ear, and another set of three digits in the other. Most participants recalled the digits ear by ear, rather than pair by pair. Therefore, if 496 were presented to one ear and 852 to the other, the recall would be 496852 rather than 489562.

The theory has difficulties explaining the famous cocktail party effect, proposed by British scientist Colin Cherry, which tries to explain how we are able to focus our attention toward the stimuli we find most interesting.

== Personal life ==
In 1949 he married Margaret E. Wright, also from Mold, in the district of Holywel. Together they had two daughters before going separate ways; the marriage was dissolved in 1972 when Broadbent married Margaret Gregory, who had worked as his research assistant and became a lifelong collaborator.

== Honours ==
A lecture in Broadbent's honour is given at the annual conference of the British Psychological Society.
