= Susan Gathercole =

Susan Elizabeth Gathercole OBE FBA was the Unit Director at the MRC Cognition and Brain Sciences Unit. from 2011 until 2018. She is a research psychologist, best known for her studies into working memory deficits in children. She has worked extensively with Professor Alan Baddeley, the co-creator, along with Professor Graham Hitch, of arguably the most well-researched working memory model. In 2014 she was elected a Fellow of the British Academy, the United Kingdom's national academy for the humanities and social sciences.

Gathercole was born in 1958 in Macclesfield and lived in the Manchester area until the age of 13, when her family moved to Hertfordshire. Following A-levels, she studied Psychology at the University of York from 1976 to 1979. Following graduation, she won a Social Science Research Council studentship at City University, where she studied for a PhD, under the supervision of John Gardiner and Vernon Gregg, on the subject of auditory short-term memory. She was awarded her Doctorate in 1983.

Gathercole's findings have demonstrated the link between working memory deficits in children and poor academic performance. Furthermore, she has contributed to recent research showing that working memory deficits can be overcome with computerised, adaptive working memory training.

Gathercole was appointed Officer of the Order of the British Empire (OBE) in the 2016 Birthday Honours for services to psychology and education.
