= Brown–Peterson task =

Cognitive exercise

In cognitive psychology, Brown–Peterson task (or Brown–Peterson procedure) refers to a cognitive exercise designed to test the limits of working memory duration. The task is named for two notable experiments published in the 1950s in which it was first documented, the first by John Brown and the second by husband-and-wife team Lloyd and Margaret Peterson.

The task aims to test the quantity of objects that can be held in working memory while preventing participants from using mnemonics or other memory techniques separate from the working memory to increase recall capacity. In the experiment, participants view a sequence of three-letter constructs called trigrams, and are asked to perform simple algebraic computations such as counting backward by 3s from 999 between each trigram. A trigram consists of three non-morphemic letters, the importance of which is that each letter represents a different independent object to be stored in working memory; therefore, trigrams avoid letter combinations that depict words or common acronyms. The algebraic computations are administered between trigrams to assure the participant isn't using mnemonic strategies to chunk the letters into a single object. Variants of the Brown–Peterson task are still used today, all with the same fundamental concept of administering items for the participant to remember while preventing the usage of additional cognitive resources to augment working memory.

== Procedure ==
The Brown–Peterson task refers to two studies published in the late 1950s that used similar procedures; one in 1958 by John Brown and a second in 1959 by Lloyd and Margaret Peterson.

The first experiment involved 24 psychology students at Indiana University at the time. The examiner proceeded by spelling a random three-letter nonsense syllable and then enunciating immediately afterward a random three-digit number. The subject would then count backwards by some assigned number, either three or four, from the enunciated number.

After a set interval, a light signal was flashed to prompt the subject to cease verbally counting and to recall the random, three-letter nonsense syllable. The time interval between the enunciation by the examiner of the nonsense syllable (exposure to the syllable) and the signal prompt to the participant was known as the recall interval; the time interval between the signal prompt and the enunciation of the third letter by the participant was known as a latency. In order to maintain reproducibility of results, each participant was tested eight times using each recall interval, which were 3, 6, 9, 12, and 15 seconds. In addition, each nonsense syllable appeared an equal number of times; the trials were split evenly in terms of counting by either three or four. No successive items contained the same letters, and the time between signal for recall and the next trial was always 15 seconds. In addition, the examiner and participant were instructed to enunciate in rhythm with a 120 BPM metronome, such that two letters or numbers were spoken per second.

The second experiment involved 48 psychology students from Indiana University. The exact procedure from the first experiment was followed for 24 of the students, but the other 24 were asked to repeat the stimulus (i.e., the nonsense syllable) aloud until the examiner stated the three-digit number. Therefore, the only difference between the two experiments was that there was a variable gap between the examiner's enunciation of the stimulus and the number, during which maintenance rehearsal took place. The inspiration behind this experiment was Brown's disbelief that repetition would strengthen the "memory trace". The purpose of the second experiment was basically to prove or disprove this notion. However, the analysis of the study concluded that forgetting was found to progress at differential rates dependent upon the amount of rehearsal that took place.

== Interference ==
There are two types of interference:

Retroactive interference: This type of interference occurs when new information disrupts the recall of old information.

Proactive interference: This type of interference occurs when old information disrupts the recall of new information.

Proactive interference affects participant performance in the Brown–Peterson task. The first time the students participate in the task, they show little loss of information. However, after multiple trials, the task becomes increasingly challenging when letters from the early trials are confused with letters in the current trial. Fortunately, proactive interference can be hindered if the information to be remembered is changed to a different type of information. For example, in the Brown–Peterson task there appeared to be little proactive interference when the participants switched from recalling letters to recalling numbers.

== Rehearsal ==
A key aspect of the Brown–Peterson task is the fact that it blocks rehearsal, which is used to better recall items in short-term memory. Rehearsal is the concept of directing attention to material that was just learned. This way, it can lengthen the duration of one's short-term memory capacity. In order to accurately calculate the duration of short-term memory using the Brown–Peterson task, such a method must be blocked so as not to falsely increase an unaltered duration. There are two different types of rehearsal:

Maintenance rehearsal: This method of rehearsal uses repetition of the items in memory. It is essentially "saying something repeatedly in order to keep it in mind". An example could be attempting to memorize a shopping list while out shopping for groceries. Instead of remembering to take the list out to the store, the shopper could leave it at home and proceed to repeat each word. As useful as this type of rehearsal may seem, it does not guarantee the ability to recall what was memorized after it is no longer rehearsed

Elaborative rehearsal: This type of rehearsal is also known as creative rehearsal. Elaborative rehearsal uses creativity to increase capacity of short-term memory and accurately recall items. Creating associations and connections between something significant to the person memorizing and the item(s) to be memorized is one example of elaborative rehearsal. Another example is the use of mnemonic devices, which are a creative way to mentally arrange the items to be memorized.

Three key words in rehearsal are Association, Location, and Imagination. Association is an important factor in rehearsal, as it is the part of elaborative rehearsal where people make connections with the items and things significant to them. This helps increase capacity of short-term memory as they are recalling items with the help of something meaningful to them. Location is another factor, as incorporating location into what they are trying to memorize may be another association to a significant location in particular, thus making the item much easier to recall. Finally, imagination is essentially the creativity of elaborative rehearsal. It combines creativity with the items to recall in such a way that makes them easiest to recall.
