= Paul Bertelson =

- Born: December 19, 1926; Forest, Brussels, Belgium
- Died: November 26, 2008 (aged 81); Woluwe-Saint-Pierre, Brussels, Belgium
- Education: Université libre de Bruxelles (ULB)
- Known for: Experimental cognitive psychology and cognitive neuropsychology: Chronometry of mental processes, Repetition (priming) effects, Serial organization of reaction processes, Audio-visual interactions, Laterality, Literacy and phonological processes
- Awards: 1991 - Ernest-John Solvay Price for the Human Sciences; 1990 - Francqui Chair at Université Catholique de Louvain; 1982 - Francqui Chair at Katholieke Universiteit Leuven; 1964 - Kenneth Craik Research Award of St-Georges College, Cambridge, UK
- Scientific career
- Institutions: Université libre de Bruxelles (ULB)

Paul Bertelson (1926–2008), was an internationally recognized experimental cognitive psychologist.

== Background and academic achievements ==
Graduated from the Solvay Business School in 1949 and from the Psychology School in 1953, both at Université libre de Bruxelles (ULB), Paul Bertelson obtained a PhD grant from the Belgian National Fund for Scientific Research (FNRS) at the Laboratory of Psychology. From 1955 to 1959 he was Assistant of Professor André Ombredane, obtaining his PhD in Psychology in 1959. He became Professor in 1962 (teaching Experimental psychology and Cognitive psychology) and Emeritus Professor in 1990. At ULB, Paul Bertelson created the Laboratory of Experimental Psychology in 1964, being its Head until 1990. He was President of the Faculty of Psychological and Pedagogical Sciences from 1977 to 1980. He acted as President of the XXVth International Congress of Psychology (Brussels, 1992) and was one of the founding members of the European Training Program in Brain and Behaviour Research in 1969. He was also member of the steering Committees of the Attention and Performance Seminars and of the Annual Bressanone meetings in Cognitive Neuropsychology. In 1985, Paul Bertelson and four other leading figures in the field of Cognitive Psychology (Alan Baddeley, Janet Jackson, John Michon, and Wolfgang Prinz) founded the European Society for Cognitive Psychology (ESCOP). He acted as President (1991–92) and Vice-president (1993–94) of ESCOP. To honor his contributions to the field, the board of ESCOP decided to award a prestigious prize every two years to a young and outstanding scientist, naming the award the “Paul Bertelson award”.

== Scientific achievements ==
At the beginning of his career, he stayed for one year (1957) at the M.R.C. Applied Psychology Research Unit in Cambridge where he interacted with Poulton, Donald Broadbent and others. This led him to take part in the study of “skills”, i.e. of the processes involved in reaction time situations, based on the idea (expressed in his PhD thesis) that the comprehension of the mechanisms of complex abilities can be reached by studying systematically how elementary reactions are integrated in a continuous activity. He thus manipulated sequential dependencies to examine the preparation to react as this is limited by uncertainty concerning both the nature and the moment of the signal occurrence. The demonstration of a repetition effect was one of his most important results. Methodologically, the “Bertelson’s repetition effect” was indeed an important contribution to later priming studies. In this domain, Bertelson also contributed to better understand the refractoriness or central intermittence phenomenon.
In the early 1970s, Paul Bertelson, while training PhD students who became his close collaborators, channeled his research into three new main directions: (1) on perception, with a detailed program to understand the spatial and temporal aspects of audiovisual interactions (Monique Radeau), (2) on cognitive neuropsychology, mainly concerning hemispheric differences and the role of spatial attention in perceptual laterality effects (José Morais); and (3) on cognitive psycholinguistics, in particular the role of phonemic awareness in learning to read, compared to other forms of phonological awareness (Jesus Alegria, José Morais, Alain Content, Régine Kolinsky); and the processing of written words, including in braille reading (Daniel Holender, Philippe Mousty). Bertelson also strongly encouraged the development by Jesus Alegria and Jacqueline Leybaert, in collaboration with his colleague Olivier Périer, of a fourth research line, on the role of phonology in literacy processes in deaf children.
In all these programs, important scientific accomplishments have been performed, turning Paul Bertelson’s Laboratoire de Pychologie expérimentale one of the most influential centers of experimental cognitive psychology in Europe until less than ten years ago. Now formally extinguished, this Laboratory was the precursor, and its still active researchers a significant force, of the present ULB’s Center for Research in Cognition and Neurosciences (CRCN), itself one component of the ULB Neuroscience Institute (UNI). In the last years of his life, Paul Bertelson has been also associated to Tilburg University where he strongly collaborated with Beatrice de Gelder and Jean Vroomen both on audiovisual interactions (mainly in a neuropsychological perspective) and on psycholinguistic issues.

== Main publications ==
- Bertelson, Paul; Boons, Jean-Paul (1960). "Time Uncertainty and Choice Reaction Time". Nature. 187 (4736): 531–532. Bibcode:1960Natur.187..531B. doi:10.1038/187531a0. hdl:2013/ULB-DIPOT:oai:dipot.ulb.ac.be:2013/166024. PMID 13799960. S2CID 4168565.
- Bertelson, Paul (1961). "Sequential Redundancy and Speed in a Serial Two-Choice Responding Task". Quarterly Journal of Experimental Psychology. 13 (2): 90–102. doi:10.1080/17470216108416478. S2CID 144157457.
- Bertelson, Paul (1965). "Serial Choice Reaction-time as a Function of Response versus Signal-and-Response Repetition". Nature. 206 (4980): 217–218. Bibcode:1965Natur.206..217B. doi:10.1038/206217a0. hdl:2013/ULB-DIPOT:oai:dipot.ulb.ac.be:2013/169903. PMID 5830165. S2CID 2856972.
- Bertelson, Paul; Barzeele, Jacques (1965). "Interaction of time-uncertainty and relative signal frequency in determining choice reaction time". Journal of Experimental Psychology. 70 (5): 448–451. doi:10.1037/h0022534. hdl:2013/ULB-DIPOT:oai:dipot.ulb.ac.be:2013/233781. PMID 5833664.
- Bertelson, Paul (1966). "Central Intermittency Twenty Years Later". Quarterly Journal of Experimental Psychology. 18 (2): 153–163. doi:10.1080/14640746608400022. hdl:2013/ULB-DIPOT:oai:dipot.ulb.ac.be:2013/233784. PMID 5327439. S2CID 28814171.
- Bertelson, Paul; Tisseyre, Françoise (1966). "Choice Reaction Time as a Function of Stimulus versus Response Relative Frequency of Occurrence". Nature. 212 (5066): 1069–1070. Bibcode:1966Natur.212.1069B. doi:10.1038/2121069a0. hdl:2013/ULB-DIPOT:oai:dipot.ulb.ac.be:2013/167510. PMID 21090504. S2CID 4176984.
- Bertelson, Paul (1967). "The Time Course of Preparation". Quarterly Journal of Experimental Psychology. 19 (3): 272–279. doi:10.1080/14640746708400102. hdl:2013/ULB-DIPOT:oai:dipot.ulb.ac.be:2013/233785. PMID 6074169. S2CID 28026424.
- Bertelson, P. (1972). "Listening from Left to Right versus Right to Left". Perception. 1 (2): 161–165. doi:10.1068/p010161. hdl:2013/ULB-DIPOT:oai:dipot.ulb.ac.be:2013/233823. PMID 4669402. S2CID 6236491.
- Morais, Jose; Bertelson, Paul (1975). "Spatial position versus ear of entry as determinant of the auditory laterality effects: A stereophonic test". Journal of Experimental Psychology: Human Perception and Performance. 1 (3): 253–262. doi:10.1037/0096-1523.1.3.253. hdl:2013/ULB-DIPOT:oai:dipot.ulb.ac.be:2013/167116. PMID 1202148.
- Holender, Daniel; Bertelson, Paul (1975). "Selective preparation and time uncertainty". Acta Psychologica. 39 (3): 193–203. doi:10.1016/0001-6918(75)90034-7. PMID 1163275.
- Morais, José; Cary, Luz; Alegria, Jésus; Bertelson, Paul (1979). "Does awareness of speech as a sequence of phones arise spontaneously?". Cognition. 7 (4): 323–331. doi:10.1016/0010-0277(79)90020-9. S2CID 17520587.
- Bertelson, Paul (1982). "Lateral Differences in Normal Man and Lateralization of Brain Function". International Journal of Psychology. 17 (1–4): 173–210. doi:10.1080/00207598208247441. hdl:2013/ULB-DIPOT:oai:dipot.ulb.ac.be:2013/233791. S2CID 143719630.
- Bertelson, P.; Morais, J.; Alegria, J.; Content, A. (1985). "Phonetic analysis capacity and learning to read". Nature. 313 (5997): 73–74. Bibcode:1985Natur.313...73B. doi:10.1038/313073c0. S2CID 4339385.
- Mousty, Philippe; Bertelson, Paul (1985). "A Study of Braille Reading: 1. Reading Speed as a Function of Hand Usage and Context". The Quarterly Journal of Experimental Psychology Section A. 37 (2): 217–233. doi:10.1080/14640748508400931. PMID 4023273. S2CID 21103124.
- Bertelson, Paul; Mousty, Philippe; d'Alimonte, Graziella (1985). "A Study of Braille Reading: 2. Patterns of Hand Activity in One-Handed and Two-Handed Reading". The Quarterly Journal of Experimental Psychology Section A. 37 (2): 235–256. doi:10.1080/14640748508400932. hdl:2013/ULB-DIPOT:oai:dipot.ulb.ac.be:2013/80076. PMID 4023274. S2CID 28416213.
- Bertelson, Paul (1986). "The onset of literacy: Liminal remarks". Cognition. 24 (1–2): 1–30. doi:10.1016/0010-0277(86)90002-8. PMID 3539488. S2CID 40716546.
- Bertelson, Paul; Mousty, Philippe; Radeau, Monique (1992). "The time course of braille word recognition". Journal of Experimental Psychology: Learning, Memory, and Cognition. 18 (2): 284–297. doi:10.1037/0278-7393.18.2.284. PMID 1532821. S2CID 36933293.
- Mousty, P.; Bertelson, P. (1992). "Finger movements in braille reading: The effect of local ambiguity". Cognition. 43 (1): 67–84. doi:10.1016/0010-0277(92)90032-D. PMID 1591903. S2CID 45764135.
- De Gelder, Beatrice; Bertelson, Paul (2003). "Multisensory integration, perception and ecological validity". Trends in Cognitive Sciences. 7 (10): 460–467. doi:10.1016/j.tics.2003.08.014. PMID 14550494. S2CID 18230239.
- Bertelson, Paul; Vroomen, Jean; De Gelder, Béatrice (2003). "Visual Recalibration of Auditory Speech Identification". Psychological Science. 14 (6): 592–597. doi:10.1046/j.0956-7976.2003.psci_1470.x. PMID 14629691. S2CID 21368156.
