= Long-term memory =

Process of storage and retrieval memory

Long-term memory (LTM) is the stage of the Atkinson–Shiffrin memory model in which informative knowledge is held indefinitely. It is defined in contrast to sensory memory, the initial stage, and short-term or working memory, the second stage, which persists for about 18 to 30 seconds. LTM is grouped into two categories known as explicit memory (declarative memory) and implicit memory (non-declarative memory). Explicit memory is broken down into episodic and semantic memory, while implicit memory includes procedural memory and emotional conditioning.

== Stores ==
The idea of separate memories for short- and long-term storage originated in the 19th century. One model of memory developed in the 1960s assumed that all memories are formed in one store and transfer to another store after a small period of time. This model is referred to as the "modal model", most famously detailed by Shiffrin. The model states that memory is first stored in sensory memory, which has a large capacity but can only maintain information for milliseconds. A representation of that rapidly decaying memory is moved to short-term memory. Short-term memory does not have a large capacity like sensory memory but holds information for seconds or minutes. The final storage is long-term memory, which has a very large capacity and is capable of holding information possibly for a lifetime.

The exact mechanisms by which this transfer takes place, whether all or only some memories are retained permanently, and even to have the existence of a genuine distinction between stores, remain controversial.

=== Evidence ===
==== Anterograde amnesia ====
One form of evidence cited in favor of the existence of a short-term store comes from anterograde amnesia, the inability to learn new facts and episodes. Patients with this form of amnesia have an intact ability to retain small amounts of information over short time scales (up to 30 seconds) but have little ability to form longer-term memories (illustrated by patient HM). This is interpreted as showing that the short-term store is protected from damage and diseases.

==== Distraction tasks ====
Other evidence comes from experimental studies showing that some manipulations impair memory for the 3 to 5 most recently learned words of a list (it is presumed that they are held in short-term memory). Recall for words from earlier in the list (it is presumed, stored in long-term memory) are unaffected. Other manipulations (e.g., semantic similarity of the words) affect only memory for earlier list words, but do not affect memory for the most recent few words. These results show that different factors affect short-term recall (disruption of rehearsal) and long-term recall (semantic similarity). Together, these findings show that long-term memory and short-term memory can vary independently of each other.

=== Models ===
==== Unitary model ====
Not all researchers agree that short- and long-term memory are separate systems. The alternative Unitary Model proposes that short-term memory consists of temporary activations of long-term representations (that there is one memory that behaves variously over all time scales, from milliseconds to years). It has been difficult to identify a sharp boundary between short- and long-term memory. Eugen Tarnow, a physics researcher, reported that the recall probability versus latency curve is a straight line from 6 to 600 seconds, with the probability of failure to recall only saturating after 600 seconds. If two different stores were operating in this time domain, it is reasonable to expect a discontinuity in this curve. Other research has shown that the detailed pattern of recall errors looks remarkably similar to recall of a list immediately after learning (it is presumed, from short-term memory) and recall after 24 hours (necessarily from long-term memory).

Further evidence for a unified store comes from experiments involving continual distractor tasks. In 1974, Bjork and Whitten, psychology researchers, presented subjects with word pairs to remember; before and after each word pair, subjects performed a simple multiplication task for 12 seconds. After the final word-pair, subjects performed the multiplication distractor task for 20 seconds. They reported that the recency effect (the increased probability of recall of the last items studied) and the primacy effect (the increased probability of recall of the first few items) was sustained. These results are incompatible with a separate short-term memory as the distractor items should have displaced some of the word-pairs in the buffer, thereby weakening the associated strength of the items in long-term memory.

Ovid Tzeng (1973) reported an instance where the recency effect in free recall did not seem to result from a short-term memory store. Subjects were presented with four study-test periods of 10-word lists, with a continual distractor task (20-second period of counting-backward). At the end of each list, participants had to free recall as many words as possible. After recall of the fourth list, participants were asked to recall items from all four lists. Both the initial and final recall showed a recency effect. These results violated the predictions of a short-term memory model, where no recency effect would be expected.

Koppenaal and Glanzer (1990) attempted to explain these phenomena as a result of the subjects' adaptation to the distractor task, which allowed them to preserve at least some short-term memory capabilities. In their experiment, the long-term recency effect disappeared when the distractor after the last item differed from the distractors that preceded and followed the other items (e.g., arithmetic distractor task and word reading distractor task). Thapar and Greene challenged this theory. In one of their experiments, participants were given a different distractor task after every study item. According to Koppenaal and Glanzer's theory, no recency effect would be expected as subjects would not have had time to adapt to the distractor; yet such a recency effect remained in place in the experiment.

==== Another explanation ====
One proposed explanation for recency in a continual distractor condition, and its disappearance in an end-only distractor task is the influence of contextual and distinctive processes. According to this model, recency is a result of the similarity of the final items' processing context to the processing context of the other items and the distinctive position of the final items versus intermediate items. In the end distractor task, the processing context of the final items is no longer similar to that of the other list items. At the same time, retrieval cues for these items are no longer as effective as without the distractor. Therefore, recency recedes or vanishes. However, when distractor tasks are placed before and after each item, recency returns, because all the list items have similar processing context.

== Dual-store memory model ==
According to George Miller, whose paper in 1956 popularized the theory of the "magic number seven", short-term memory is limited to a certain number of chunks of information, while long-term memory has a limitless store.

=== Atkinson–Shiffrin memory model ===
According to the dual store memory model proposed in 1968 by Richard C. Atkinson and Richard Shiffrin, memories can reside in the short-term "buffer" for a limited time while they are simultaneously strengthening their associations in LTM. When items are first presented, they enter short-term memory for approximately twenty to thirty seconds, but due to its limited space, as new items enter, older ones are pushed out. The limit of items that can be held in the short-term memory is an average between four and seven, yet, with practice and new skills that number can be increased. However, each time an item in short-term memory is rehearsed, it is strengthened in long-term memory. Similarly, the longer an item stays in short-term memory, the stronger its association becomes in long-term memory.

=== Baddeley's model of working memory ===
In 1974, Baddeley and Hitch proposed an alternative theory of short-term memory, Baddeley's model of working memory. According to this theory, short-term memory is divided into different slave systems for different types of input items, and there is an executive control supervising what items enter and exit those systems. The slave systems include the phonological loop, the visuo-spatial sketchpad, and the episodic buffer (later added by Baddeley).

== Encoding of information ==
LTM encodes information semantically for storage, as researched by Baddeley. In vision, the information needs to enter working memory before it can be stored into LTM. This is evidenced by the fact that the speed with which information is stored into LTM is determined by the amount of information that can be fit, at each step, into visual working memory. In other words, the larger the capacity of working memory for certain stimuli, the faster will these materials be learned.

Synaptic consolidation is the process by which items are transferred from short- to long-term memory. Within the first minutes or hours after acquisition, the engram (memory trace) is encoded within synapses, becoming resistant (though not immune) to interference from outside sources.

As LTM is subject to fading in the natural forgetting process, maintenance rehearsal (several recalls/retrievals of memory) may be needed to preserve long-term memories. Individual retrievals can take place in increasing intervals in accordance with the principle of spaced repetition. This can happen quite naturally through reflection or deliberate recall (also known as recapitulation), often dependent on the perceived importance of the material. Using testing methods as a form of recall can lead to the testing effect, which aids long-term memory through information retrieval and feedback.

In LTM, brain cells fire in specific patterns. When someone experiences something in the world, the brain responds by creating a pattern of specific nerves firing in a specific way to represent the experience. This is called distributed representation. Distributed representation can be explained through a scientific calculator. At the top of the calculator is an opening in which the numbers typed in show up. This small slot is compiled by many blocks that light up to show a specific number. In that sense, certain blocks light up when prompted to show the number 4, but other blocks light up to show the number 5. There may be overlap in the blocks used, but ultimately, these blocks are able to generate different patterns for each specific situation. The encoding of specific episodic memories can be explained through distributed representation. When you try to remember an experience, perhaps your friend's birthday party a year ago, your brain is activating a certain pattern of neurons. If you try to remember your mother's birthday party, another pattern of neurons is fired but there may be overlap because they are both birthday parties. This kind of remembering is the idea of retrieval because it involves recalling the specific distributed representation created during the encoding of the experience.

=== Sleep ===
Some theories consider sleep to be an important factor in establishing well-organized long-term memories. (See also sleep and learning.) Sleep plays a key function in the consolidation of new memories.

According to Tarnow's theory, long-term memories are stored in dream format (reminiscent of Penfield & Rasmussen's findings that electrical excitations of the cortex give rise to experiences similar to dreams). During waking life an executive function interprets LTM consistent with reality checking (Tarnow 2003). It is further proposed in the theory that the information stored in memory, no matter how it was learned, can affect performance on a particular task without the subject being aware that this memory is being used. Newly acquired declarative memory traces are believed to be reactivated during NonREM sleep to promote their hippocampo-neocortical transfer for long-term storage. Specifically, new declarative memories are better remembered if recall follows Stage II non-rapid eye movement sleep. The reactivation of memories during sleep can lead to lasting synaptic changes within certain neural networks. It is the high spindle activity, low oscillation activity, and delta wave activity during NREM sleep that helps to contribute to declarative memory consolidation. In learning before sleep, spindles are redistributed to neuronally active up-states within slow oscillations during NREM sleep. Sleep spindles are thought to induce synaptic changes and thereby contribute to memory consolidation during sleep. Here, we examined the role of sleep in the object-place recognition task, a task closely comparable to tasks typically applied for testing human declarative memory: It is a one-trial task, hippocampus-dependent, not stressful and can be repeated within the same animal. Sleep deprivation reduces vigilance or arousal levels, affecting the efficiency of certain cognitive functions such as learning and memory.

The theory that sleep benefits memory retention is not a new idea. It has been around since Ebbinghaus's experiment on forgetting in 1885. More recently studies have been done by Payne and colleagues and Holtz and colleagues. In Payne and colleague's experiment participants were randomly selected and split into two groups. Both groups were given semantically related or unrelated word pairs, but one group was given the information at 9 A.M. and the other group received theirs at 9 P.M. Participants were then tested on the word pairs at one of three intervals 30 minutes, 12 hours, or 24 hours later. It was found that participants who had a period of sleep between the learning and testing sessions did better on the memory tests. This information is similar to other results found by previous experiments by Jenkins and Dallenbach (1924). It has also been found that many domains of declarative memory are affected by sleep such as emotional memory, semantic memory, and direct encoding.

Holtz found that not only does sleep affect consolidation of declarative memories, but also procedural memories. In this experiment, fifty adolescent participants were taught either word pairs (which represents declarative memory) and a finger tapping task (procedural memory) at one of two different times of day. What they found was that the procedural finger tapping task was best encoded and remembered directly before sleep, but the declarative word pairs task was better remembered and encoded if learned at 3 in the afternoon.

== Divisions ==
The brain does not store memories in one unified structure. Instead, different types of memory are stored in different regions of the brain. LTM is typically divided up into two major headings: explicit memory and implicit memory.

=== Explicit memory ===
Explicit memory (or declarative memory) refers to all memories that are consciously available. These are encoded by the hippocampus, entorhinal cortex, and perirhinal cortex, but consolidated and stored elsewhere. The precise location of storage is unknown, but the temporal cortex has been proposed as a likely candidate. Research by Meulemans and Van der Linden (2003) found that amnesiac patients with damage to the medial temporal lobe performed more poorly on explicit learning tests than did healthy controls. However, these same amnesiac patients performed at the same rate as healthy controls on implicit learning tests. This implies that the medial temporal lobe is heavily involved in explicit learning, but not in implicit learning.

Declarative memory has three major subdivisions:

==== Episodic memory ====
Episodic memory allows individuals to remember specific facts and events that happened to them personally, making them easier to recall by binding them to the time and place they occurred. This makes the memory stand out, in contrast to semantic memory which is more general. Experiments conducted by Spaniol and colleagues indicated that older adults have worse episodic memories than younger adults because episodic memory uses context dependent memory. It is said that episodic memories are not as detailed or accurate as people grow older in age. Some people may begin to have issues with identification or presentation related things as they age. They may not be able to recall things from their memory or have as good of a storage for details as they may have been able to do in the past.

Recent studies have found that the medial temporal lobe (MTL), which involves the hippocampus, perirhinal cortex, entorhinal cortex, and parahippocampal cortex, is important in the encoding of and retrieval of episodic memories. The hippocampus is where memories are first encoded into the brain, and evidence shows that damage to the hippocampus prevents new memories from being formed.

Another part of the brain involved in episodic memory encoding and retrieval is the neocortex and neocortical structures. Studies have shown that, when actively encoding new memories, there is activity shown in the neocortical networks in the prefrontal cortex.

When it comes to improving episodic memory, according to Damien Moore and Paul D. Loprinzi, episodic memory can be improved using long-term potentiation. This is when synapses are made to be more durable with exercise. The durability and healthiness of the synapses will in time be able to pick up more connections with neurons and eventually help with episodic memory. Mnemonic training has also been proven to be effective with the sharpening of episodic memory. These trainings include things like the alphabet, music, numerical systems, and other learning systems. Studies by Shuyuan Chen and Zhihui Cai have shown that mnemonic training has shown to be able to improve episodic memory long term.

==== Semantic memory ====
Semantic memory refers to a kind of long-term memory that involves the encoding, storage, and retrieval of general facts and knowledge unconnected to any specific memory structure. Semantic memory is unspecific in where it originates from, distinctive from episodic memory. This system allows people to remember facts without having to connect it to the specific memory of having learned it. For example, knowing and understanding what a chair is without having to connect it to any specific memory of asking what a chair is, when you learned what it is, etc. The concept of separating declarative memory into episodic and semantic memory was introduced by Endel Tulving in the early 1970s. This distinction has led to significant research in cognitive processes and memory retrieval. In contrast with episodic memory, older adults and younger adults do not show much of a difference in semantic memory, presumably because semantic memory does not depend on context memory.

==== Autobiographical memory ====
Autobiographical memory refers to knowledge about events and personal experiences from an individual's own life. Autobiographical memories are facilitated by aids including verbal, face-evoked, picture-evoked, odour-evoked, and music-evoked autobiographical memory cues. Though similar to episodic memory, it differs in that it contains only those experiences that are relevant to the life experiences of an individual. Conway and Pleydell-Pearce (2000) argue that this is one component of the self-memory system.

=== Implicit memory ===
Implicit memory (procedural memory) refers to the use of objects or movements of the body, such as how exactly to use a pencil, drive a car, or ride a bicycle. This type of memory is encoded, and it is presumed stored by the striatum and other parts of the basal ganglia. The basal ganglia are believed to mediate procedural memory and other brain structures and are largely independent of the hippocampus. Research by Manelis, Hanson, and Hanson (2011) found that the reactivation of the parietal and occipital regions was associated with implicit memory. Procedural memory is considered non-declarative memory or unconscious memory which includes priming and non-associative learning. The first part of nondeclarative memory (implicit memory) involves priming. Priming occurs when you do something faster after you have already done that activity, such as writing or using a fork. Other categories of memory may also be relevant to the discussion of LTM. For example:

Emotional memory, the memory for events that evoke a particularly strong emotion, is a domain that can involve both declarative and procedural memory processes. Emotional memories are consciously available, but elicit a powerful, unconscious physiological reaction. Research indicates that the amygdala is extremely active during emotional situations and acts with the hippocampus and prefrontal cortex in the encoding and consolidation of emotional events.

Working memory is not part of LTM but is important for it to function. Working memory holds and manipulates information for a short period of time, before it is either forgotten or encoded into LTM. Then, in order to remember something from LTM, it must be brought back into working memory. If working memory is overloaded, it can affect the encoding of LTM. If one has a good working memory, they may have a better LTM encoding.

== Disorders of memory ==
Minor slips and lapses of memory are fairly commonplace and may increase naturally with age, when ill, or under stress. Some women may experience more memory lapses following the onset of the menopause. In general, more serious problems with memory occur due to traumatic brain injury or neurodegenerative disease.

=== Traumatic brain injury ===
The majority of findings on memory have been the result of studies that lesioned specific brain regions in rats or primates, but some of the most important work has been the result of accidental or inadvertent brain trauma. The most famous case in recent memory studies is the case study of HM, who had parts of his hippocampus, parahippocampal cortices, and surrounding tissue removed in an attempt to cure his epilepsy. His subsequent total anterograde amnesia and partial retrograde amnesia provided the first evidence for the localization of memory function, and further clarified the differences between declarative and procedural memory.

=== Neurodegenerative diseases ===
Many neurodegenerative diseases can cause memory loss. Some of the most prevalent (and, as a consequence, most intensely researched) include Alzheimer's disease, dementia, Huntington's disease, multiple sclerosis, and Parkinson's disease. None act specifically on memory; instead, memory loss is often a casualty of generalized neuronal deterioration. Currently, these illnesses are irreversible, but research into stem cells, psychopharmacology, and genetic engineering holds much promise.

Those with Alzheimer's disease generally display symptoms such as getting momentarily lost on familiar routes, placing possessions in inappropriate locations, and distortions of existing memories or completely forgetting memories. Researchers have often used the Deese–Roediger–McDermott paradigm (DRM) to study the effects of Alzheimer's disease on memory. The DRM paradigm presents a list of words such as doze, pillow, bed, dream, nap, etc., but no theme word is presented. In this case, the theme word would have been "sleep." Alzheimer's disease patients are more likely to recall the theme word as being part of the original list than healthy adults. There is a possible link between longer encoding times and increased false memory in LTM. The patients end up relying on the gist of the information instead of the specific words themselves. Alzheimer's disease leads to an uncontrolled inflammatory response brought on by extensive amyloid deposition in the brain, which leads to cell death in the brain. This gets worse over time and eventually leads to cognitive decline after the loss of memory. Pioglitazone may improve cognitive impairments, including memory loss, and may help protect long-term and visuospatial memory from neurodegenerative diseases.

Parkinson's disease patients have problems with cognitive performance; these issues resemble those seen in frontal lobe patients and can often lead to dementia. It is thought that Parkinson's disease is caused by degradation of the dopaminergic mesocorticolimbic projection originating from the ventral tegmental area. It has also been indicated that the hippocampus plays an important role in episodic and spatial (parts of LTM) memory, and Parkinson's disease patients have abnormal hippocampuses resulting in abnormal LTM functioning. L-dopa injections are often used to try to relieve Parkinson's disease symptoms, as well as behavioral therapy.

Schizophrenia patients have trouble with attention and executive functions, which in turn affects LTM consolidation and retrieval. They cannot encode or retrieve temporal information properly, which causes them to select inappropriate social behaviors. They cannot effectively use the information they possess. The prefrontal cortex, where schizophrenia patients have structural abnormalities, is involved with the temporal lobe and also affects the hippocampus, which causes their difficulty in encoding and retrieving temporal information (including LTM).

== Biological underpinnings at the cellular level ==
Long-term memory, unlike short-term memory, is dependent upon the synthesis of new proteins. This occurs within the cellular body, and concerns the particular transmitters, receptors, and new synapse pathways that reinforce the communicative strength between neurons. The production of new proteins devoted to synapse reinforcement is triggered after the release of certain signaling substances (such as calcium within hippocampal neurons) in the cell. In the case of hippocampal cells, this release is dependent upon the expulsion of magnesium (a binding molecule) that is expelled after significant and repetitive synaptic signaling. The temporary expulsion of magnesium frees NMDA receptors to release calcium in the cell, a signal that leads to gene transcription and the construction of reinforcing proteins. For more information, see long-term potentiation (LTP).

One of the newly synthesized proteins in LTP is also critical for maintaining LTM. This protein is an autonomously active form of the enzyme protein kinase C (PKC), known as PKMζ. PKMζ maintains the activity-dependent enhancement of synaptic strength and inhibiting PKMζ erases established long-term memories, without affecting short-term memory or, once the inhibitor is eliminated, the ability to encode and store new long-term memories is restored.

Also, BDNF is important for the persistence of long-term memories.

The long-term stabilization of synaptic changes is also determined by a parallel increase of pre- and postsynaptic structures such as synaptic boutons, dendritic spines, and postsynaptic density. On the molecular level, an increase of the postsynaptic scaffolding proteins PSD-95 and HOMER1c has been shown to correlate with the stabilization of synaptic enlargement.

The cAMP response element-binding protein (CREB) is a transcription factor which is believed to be important in consolidating short- to long-term memories, and which is believed to be downregulated in Alzheimer's disease.

=== DNA methylation and demethylation ===
Rats exposed to an intense learning event may retain a life-long memory of the event, even after a single training session. The LTM of such an event appears to be initially stored in the hippocampus, but this storage is transient. Much of the long-term storage of the memory seems to take place in the anterior cingulate cortex. When such an exposure was experimentally applied, more than 5,000 differently methylated DNA regions appeared in the hippocampus neuronal genome of the rats at one and at 24 hours after training. These alterations in methylation pattern occurred at many genes that were down-regulated, often due to the formation of new 5-methylcytosine sites in CpG rich regions of the genome. Furthermore, many other genes were upregulated, likely often due to hypomethylation. Hypomethylation often results from the removal of methyl groups from previously existing 5-methylcytosines in DNA. Demethylation is carried out by several proteins acting in concert, including TET enzymes as well as enzymes of the DNA base excision repair pathway (see Epigenetics in learning and memory). The pattern of induced and repressed genes in brain neurons subsequent to an intense learning event likely provides the molecular basis for a LTM of the event.

== Contradictory evidence ==
Some studies have yielded results that contradict the dual-store memory model. Studies showed that in spite of using distractors, there was still both a recency effect for a list of items and a contiguity effect.

Another study revealed that how long an item spends in short-term memory is not the key determinant in its strength in long-term memory. Instead, whether the participant actively tries to remember the item while elaborating on its meaning determines the strength of its store in LTM.

== Single-store memory model ==
An alternative theory is that there is only one memory store with associations among items and their contexts. In this model, the context serves as a cue for retrieval, and the recency effect is greatly caused by the factor of context. Immediate and delayed free recall will have the same recency effect because the relative similarity of the contexts still exists. Also, the contiguity effect still occurs because contiguity also exists between similar contexts.

== See also ==
- Intermediate-term memory
- De novo protein synthesis theory of memory formation
- Memory and aging
- Neurogenesis
- Short-term memory
- Sensory memory
