= Unitary theory =

Unitary theory may refer to:

== Physics ==
- Unitarity (physics), a restriction on any theory in physics that all probabilities must sum to one
- Unitary gauge, a particular choice of a gauge fixing in a gauge theory with a spontaneous symmetry breaking

== Other uses ==
- Unitary executive theory, the theory of US constitutional law holding that the President has the power to control the entire executive branch
- Unitary theories of memory, hypotheses regarding short-term and long-term memory
