= Rehearsal (educational psychology) =

Repeating information to aid remembering

Rehearsal in educational psychology refers to the "cognitive process in which information is repeated over and over as a possible way of learning and remembering it". There are two types of memory rehearsal.

The first type is called maintenance rehearsal. A person can do this by saying aloud or thinking of material repeatably until it becomes a part of the working memory. However, the material may fade from the working memory quickly. An example of this is looking up a phone number but forgetting it before being able to dial it into the phone. This is a common form of rote learning. Rote learning is learning or memorization by repetition, often without an understanding of the reasoning or relationships involved in the material that is learned. However, the material may register eventually and take large amounts of time and hard work. Maintenance rehearsal is viewed in educational psychology as an ineffective way of getting information to the long-term memory.

Another type of rehearsal is elaborative rehearsal. This entails connecting new material learned, with already existing long term memories. In this type of rehearsal repetitive tactics are not successful. A strategy such as engaging the brain of the learners in an elaboration exercise will help the memories be more storable and retrievable in the future.

== Case study ==
In the study of "The Effects of Elaboration and Rehearsal on Long-Term Retention of Shape Names by Kindergarteners", the two promising instructional paradigms, elaboration and overt rehearsal were put to test. Elaboration strategies include paraphrasing or summarizing the material to be learned, creating analogies, generative note-taking (where the student actually reorganizes and connects ideas in their notes in contrast to passive, linear note-taking), explaining the ideas in the material to be learned to someone else, and question asking and answering.

== See also ==
- Memory rehearsal
