= Thematic coherence =

In developmental psychology, thematic coherence is an organization of a set of meanings in and through an event. In education, for example, the thematic coherence happens when a child during a classroom session understands what all the talking is about.

This expression was termed by Habermas and Bluck (2000), along with other terms such as temporal coherence, biographical coherence, and causal coherence, to describe the coherence that people talk about while narrating their own personal experiences (the many different episodes in their life, most especially in childhood and adolescence) which need to be structured within a context.

In conversation — although this technique also can be found in literature — the thematic coherence is when a person (or character) "is able to derive a general theme or principle about the self based on a narrated sequence of events."

== See also ==
- Child development
- Developmental psychology
- Centration
- Private speech
- Speech perception
- Speech repetition
