= De novo protein synthesis theory of memory formation =

The de novo protein synthesis theory of memory formation is a hypothesis about the formation of the physical correlates of memory in the brain. It is widely accepted that the physiological correlates for memories are stored at the synapse between various neurons. The relative strength of various synapses in a network of neurons form the memory trace, or ‘engram,’ though the processes that support this finding are less thoroughly understood. The de novo protein synthesis theory states that the production of proteins is required to initiate and potentially maintain these plastic changes within the brain. It has much support within the neuroscience community, but some critics claim that memories can be made independent of protein synthesis.

== History ==
Originally, protein synthesis inhibitors (PSI) were only used as antibiotics. Through various mechanisms unique to each PSI, they would inhibit the synthesis of proteins, generally at the translational level. They achieved renown within the biological scientific community, when research on protein synthesis required PSI's to investigate certain physiological processes. Through this line of research, it was found that injection of PSI in the hippocampus resulted in amnesia: the memories undergoing consolidation at the time of injection were lost. After the injection, the animals (generally rats) would have their memories retested, and, as a consequence of interrupted memory consolidation, they reacted to a familiar situation as though they were in a novel environment. This gave rise to the de novo protein synthesis theory: the formation of a long-term memory requires the synthesis of new proteins.

Eric Kandel established many of the biochemical markers of learning and memory in the Aplysia (California sea slug) in the 1970s, as his findings suggested potential pathways surrounding protein synthesis. He won the Nobel prize in 2000 for his research. In the same year, Nader published his findings about the liability of retrieved memories that had already undergone consolidation. For example, memories of past events are examples of memories that have already been consolidated. Nader discovered that, in the process of remembering, retrieved memories that became reactivated would require consolidation again. Various factors could interrupt this process; but without protein synthesis, memory re-consolidation would not occur and would result in the potential loss of the retrieved memory. This has been known as the reconsolidation theory of memory, which states that, after reactivation, memories undergo a process similar to initial consolidation to return them to their permanent state. Since then, a wealth of research has been done to clarify the mechanisms, genes, and proteins involved in the physiological correlate of memory.

== Protein synthesis inhibitors ==
Protein synthesis inhibitors are a class of antibiotics, which prevent the production of new proteins by inhibiting the cell's gene expression ("Protein synthesis inhibitors", PSI). They generally operate at the ribosomal level through various mechanisms that prevent the ribosome from completing translation. Protein synthesis inhibitors that work in prokaryotic cells are often used as clinically prescribed antibiotics, while those that act of eukaryotic cells have been adapted for research purposes. In research, commonly used PSI's include anisomycin, cycloheximide, and puromycin - although the use of puromycin has stopped recently because of its toxic qualities and numerous side effects. Anisomycin has relatively high effectiveness in inhibiting protein synthesis and has a large effective time window. Cycloheximide is frequently used in acute studies, because of its high level of inhibition and ease of reversibility.

== Physiological changes ==
=== Long term potentiation ===
A line of research investigates long term potentiation (LTP), a process that describes how a memory can be consolidated between two neurons, or brain cells, ultimately by creating a circuit within the brain that can encode a memory. To initiate a learning circuit between two neurons, one prominent study described using tetanus stimulations to depolarize one neuron by 30mV, which, in turn, activated its NMDA glutamate receptors. The activation of these receptors resulted in Ca^{2+} flooding the cell, initiating a cascade of secondary messengers. The cascade of resulting reactions, brought about by secondary messengers, terminates with the activation of cAMP response binding element protein (CREB), which acts as a transcription factor for various genes and initiates their expression. Some proponents argue that the genes stimulate changes in communication between neurons, which underlie the encoding of memory; others suggest that the genes are byproducts of the LTP signaling pathway and are not directly involved in LTP. However, following the cascade of secondary messengers, no one would dispute that more AMPA receptors appear in the postsynaptic terminal.Higher numbers of AMPA receptors, taken together with the aforementioned events, allow for increased firing potential in the postsynaptic cell, which creates an improved learning circuit between these two neurons. Because of the specific, activity-dependent nature of LTP, it is an ideal model for a neural correlate of memory, as postulated by numerous studies; together, these studies show that the abolishment of LTP prevents the formation of memory at the neuronal level.

=== Systems consolidation ===
Systems consolidation is the process by which memories are shifted from a vulnerable state to a fairly permanent one. It also describes roles that certain brain structures, most notably the hippocampus, play in memory consolidation and the extent certain types of memories can be consolidated. LTP describes cellular level consolidation, which is the consolidation of a memory that occurs between individual neurons. Initially, cellular consolidation, or LTP, begins in the hippocampus; there, protein synthesis inhibitors, tetrodotoxin, lidocaine, lesions and other factors can interfere with hippocampal activity and cause memory deficits. The systems consolidation theory of memory is usually investigated by studying the loss of memory for past events (retrograde amnesia) that occurs as a result of damage to the hippocampus, which is involved in systems consolidation. Retrograde amnesia can be either temporally graded (older memories are affected less) or flat (all memories, regardless of age, are affected equally), depending on the type of memory encoded and the extent of hippocampal damage.

==== Semantic memory ====
Semantic memories (memories of facts) are one type of memory that is theorized to undergo complete systems consolidation in the hippocampus. Complete systems consolidation can eventually render semantic memories permanent, at which state they become independent from the hippocampus. There is evidence of semantic memories existing independently of any brain structure, especially when considering that the damage retrograde amnesia inflicts on semantic memory is temporally graded: there is a higher probability of older memories being retained even when the hippocampus is completely damaged. Newer semantic memories show a more variable likelihood of retainability, as they can be affected by minimal or complete destruction of the hippocampus.

==== Episodic memory ====
Episodic memories (memories of moments or events) is a type of memory that may not undergo complete systems consolidation; as a result, they remain entirely dependent on the hippocampus. Therefore, they cannot exist independently of any brain structures, unlike semantic memories. Evidence shows that complete hippocampal damage results in flat retrograde amnesia for episodic memories, including older memories. However, if the hippocampus is only partially damaged, then it is possible for the amnesia to have a temporal gradient, similar to one seen with semantic memories: older memories are more likely to be retained and newer memories less.

==== Sleep and systems consolidation ====
The mechanism for systems consolidation is unknown, but it has been established that protein synthesis must occur in the cortex, where the hippocampal independent memory is stored, and that sleep is likely to play a role in systems consolidation. Many genes are upregulated during sleep, and therefore there is a possibility that protein synthesis is active in sleep-consolidation. It remains to be seen if cortical consolidation uses the same mechanisms as the hippocampus to establish the memory trace.

== Proposed de novo proteins ==
Once it was established that proteins were involved in the formation of memories, and an understanding of how the processes surrounding the proteins worked was formed, the next stage was to identify candidates for plasticity related proteins (proteins that would support the plastic changes between neurons, PRP). While many molecules, proteins and enzymes have been implicated in the associated processes of memory, identifying the specific proteins that are synthesized specifically to facilitate memory is a challenge. Listed below are the most common candidates for PRPs that support memory and learning functions.

=== PKMzeta ===
In 2011 Todd Sacktor proposed a model for how de novo protein synthesis modulates plasticity. Protein Kinase M zeta (PKMzeta) is a plasticity related protein that regulates the physiological processes that underlie learning and memory in Sacktor's model. PKMzeta is an isoform of protein kinase C, which differs in that it doesn't have an auto-inhibitory domain that requires high levels of substrate to perpetually activate the enzyme. PKMzeta mRNA is transported to the synaptic zones of the dendrites, where it is translated through the activity of multiple signaling pathways associated with LTP. After expression, PKMzeta requires an initial phosphorylation by phosphoinositide-dependent protein kinase 1 (PDK1), after which it can operate uninhibited. Protein interacting with C kinase 1 (PICK1) normally propagates the endocytic removal of AMPA receptors containing the GluR2 subunit from the postsynaptic regions. PKMzeta and PICK1 share a common binding site, which allows them to form a multiprotein complex. N-ethylmaleimide-sensitive factor (NSF) can disrupt the binding of PICK1 to the C-terminal of the AMPA receptors. This allows PKM zeta to phosphorylate the receptors, which traffics them to the synapse and enables easier excitability of the neuron. When in the membrane, a tyrosine dense binding site in the GluR2 AMPA receptors is used by brefeldin-resistant Arf-GEF 2 (BRAG2) to be actively removed from the synapse, where it is maintained in vesicles by PICK1. PMKzeta continuously phosphorylates the GluR2 AMPA receptors to maintain their presence within the synaptic membrane. There have been many studies to confirm the roles of each of these molecules, though there is always doubt and speculation of alternative processes.

PKMzeta makes a great model for the de novo protein synthesis hypothesis. The effects of LTP summate to allow PKMzeta to be transcribed, which requires ribosomal activity in the dendrites. Blocking translation or transcription of proteins would prevent PKMzeta from being expressed, preventing the strengthening of neuronal networks that underlie a memory. Because of its long half-life, the maintenance of receptors at a synapse is not affected by PSI. But the creation of a new memory would require new PKMzeta expression, which accounts for the specificity of PSI induced amnesia.

=== Brain derived neurotrophic factor ===
Brain derived neurotrophic factor (BDNF) is a neurotrophin associated with plasticity and growth of the central nervous system. It is a PRP candidate because its expression is closely related to activity, and abnormalities in its translation and signaling results in L-LTP deficits and amnesia. BDNF has been shown to enhance the activity of early LTP, but the longer lasting phases of LTP are thought to require protein synthesis. BDNF translation inhibition through PSI has shown the characteristic LTP blocking and amnesia, which has been followed up with genetic knockouts of the BDNF expressing gene. In these BDNF deficient animals the application of external BDNF can allow for the induction of LTP. There have been cases where BDNF needed not be present for the induction of LTP, suggesting that there may be in fact many parallel PRP pathways that lead to memory formation.

BDNF and PKMzeta have some interaction effects. When LTP was induced in cell cultures in BDNF dependent ways (Theta burst stimulation or an increase in cAMP concentration) it was abolished with the application of ZIP (zeta-inhibitory peptide), a protein thought to specifically inactivate PKMzeta. This suggests that PKMzeta is the end modulator of LTP and learning. As expected PKMzeta levels dropped when PSIs were applied, but curiously this was not the case if BDNF was also applied. These findings show that BDNF modulates the LTP process to make it protein synthesis independent, contrary to the de novo protein synthesis theory.

== Criticisms ==
=== Electrical activity ===
When anisomycin is applied to the hippocampus, active memories are unable to fully consolidate and are lost. When anisomycin is applied to cell cultures, electrical activity within the cultures cease. This particular property of PSIs was not accounted for when the de novo protein synthesis theory was established, and is an alternative explanation for the amnesiac effects of PSIs. If a neuron is not electrically active, it is not transmitting information; therefore, the lack of electrical activity in the neuron by itself could be responsible for the loss of a memory. Anisomycin administered at a dose that inhibits 95% of protein synthesis and associated electrical activity is not the highest dosage used in PSI research. Higher doses may alter other processes other than protein synthesis to cause the silencing of neural activity, considering Puromycin has cytotoxic qualities, so its possible that other PSI might have similar effects that manifest in the interruption of neural firing. Additionally, anisomycin has been shown to cause a substantial catecholamine release that co-occurs with neural suppression, which has not been fully explained yet. These side effects other than the inhibition of protein synthesis may account for the amnesiac effects induced by PSI, but these findings are relatively new and are expected to receive much research attention in the near future.

=== Memory formation and LTP independent of protein synthesis ===
Demonstrating that memories can be formed, and that LTP can be initiated, without protein synthesis strongly reduces the strength of the de novo theory, which explicitly states that synthesis is required to form memories. As a result, many studies have shown various ways of inducing these events while specimens are under the effects of anisomycin or other protein synthesis inhibitors. BDNF applied to cell cultures with PSI still undergo LTP, suggesting that post-translational modifications such as phosphorylation or horizontal transport could be employed in the absence of protein synthesis. Additionally ZIP has amnesiac effects, but its specificity to PKMzeta have been questioned, which questions the accuracy of the PKMzeta model.
