= Mixed transcortical aphasia =

Neurological disorder

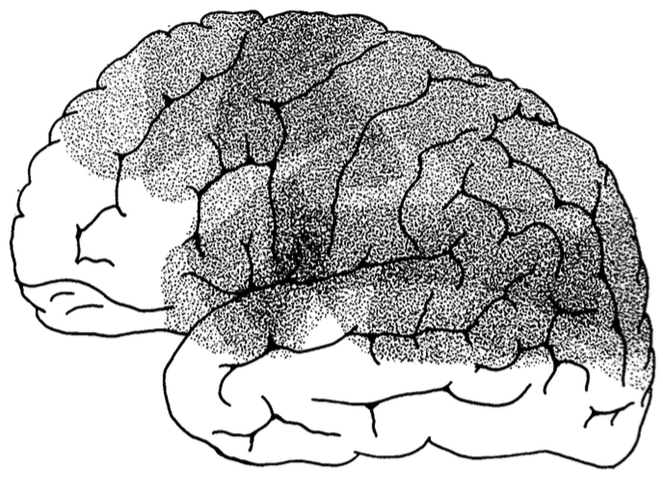
Areas affected in Mixed Transcortical Aphasia

Mixed transcortical aphasia is the least common of the three transcortical aphasias (behind transcortical motor aphasia and transcortical sensory aphasia, respectively). This type of aphasia can also be referred to as "Isolation Aphasia". This type of aphasia is a result of damage that isolates the language areas (Broca's, Wernicke's, and the arcuate fasciculus) from other brain regions. Broca's, Wernicke's, and the arcuate fasciculus are left intact; however, they are isolated from other brain regions.

A stroke is one of the leading causes of disability in the United States. Following a stroke, 40% of stroke patients are left with moderate functional impairment and 15% to 30% have a severe disability as a result of a stroke. A neurogenic cognitive-communicative disorder is one possible result of a stroke, with neuro- meaning related to nerves or the nervous system and -genic meaning resulting from or caused by. Aphasia is one type of a neurogenic cognitive-communicative disorder which presents with impaired comprehension and production of speech and language, usually caused by damage in the language-dominant, left hemisphere of the brain. Aphasia is any disorder of language that causes the patient to have the inability to communicate, whether it is through writing, speaking, or sign language.

== Symptoms and language characteristics ==
Mixed transcortical aphasia is characterized by severe speaking and comprehension impairment, but with preserved repetition. People who suffer mixed transcortical aphasia struggle greatly to produce propositional language or to understand what is being said to them, yet they can repeat long, complex utterances or finish a song once they hear the first part. Persons with mixed transcortical aphasia are often nonfluent, and in most cases do not speak unless they are spoken to, do not comprehend spoken language, cannot name objects, and cannot read or write. However, they often have the ability to repeat what is said to them. In fact, persons with mixed transcortical aphasia often repeat in a parrot-like fashion. Some patients with this disorder can experience many different types neurological symptoms including, bilateral paralysis, lack of voluntary speech, and difficulty with producing spontaneous speech.

A conversation between a clinician and person with transcortical mixed aphasia would have similar characteristics to the conversation below:

       Clinician: Hello, Mrs. Fenton
       Patient: Mrs. Fenton. Yes.
       Clinician: How are you doing today?
       Patient: How are you doing today?
       Clinician: I'm very fine, thank you. How are you doing?
       Patient: I'm very fine, thank you.
       Clinician: My name is Mary. I'll be working with you today.
       Patient: My name is Mary. I'm working today.

In this rare type of aphasia, Broca's area, Wernicke's area, and the arcuate fasciculus are intact but the watershed region around them is damaged. This damage isolates these areas from the rest of the brain. The most frequent etiology of mixed transcortical aphasia is stenosis (narrowing) of the internal carotid artery. Mixed transcortical aphasia can also occur after cerebral hypoxia, cerebral swelling, and any stroke that affects the cerebral artery. Often lesions that cause mixed transcortical aphasia affect both the anterior and posterior perisylvian border zones. Some times the type of aphasia can be determined just by knowing the lesion location. In order for a patient to be diagnosed with mixed transcortical aphasia all other forms of transcortical must be ruled out. Using WAB or the BDAE can rule out global aphasia if the ability to repeat is present. If verbal fluency is depressed transcortical aphasia gets ruled out and if auditory processing and comprehension is weak then it cannot be transcortical motor aphasia.

== Treatment and therapy ==
After a stroke, many patients feel the devastating impacts of the loss of language. Studies have looked into ways to enhance verbal communication with therapy, and one of the treatment approaches that proved to be successful is "Drawing Therapy". Drawing offers an alternative route to access semantic information. Because of this, it provides adults who have lost language with a means to access and express their ideas, emotions, and feelings. Drawing has also been shown to activate right hemisphere regions. This makes drawing a non-linguistic intervention that can access semantic knowledge in the right hemisphere. The study conducted on drawing therapy found that it increased naming abilities in patients with acute and chronic aphasia. It also produced fewer error attempts during naming tasks. The study also found that the act of drawing itself, not the quality, was critical for the activation of the semantic-lexical network required for naming tasks. Other studies have also reported that family members have seen the effects of therapy at home. The gains made from drawing therapy were not ones that could have been made from spontaneous recovery. Drawing therapy was especially found to be useful in individuals with global and anomic aphasia. Both of these individuals were found to have produced more verbalizations post-therapy. This reinforces the idea that drawing provides a mean of recruiting areas or networks that were not otherwise sufficient for producing speech. Across the majority of patients, the quality of drawing improved as well as written output and sentence structure. Drawing therapy has proved to be effective even after a few periods of therapy.

Although this therapy is aimed at patients with aphasia, it can be implemented for any patient with expressive deficits.

Drawing therapy can be implemented in the following hierarchy:

 1. Clinician gives patient a prompt and asks them to draw a response
 2. Clinician asks for clarification of drawing if it is unclear (add more detail, enlarge one aspect of the drawing)
 3. If possible, patient verbalizes about their drawing and assigns language

Drawing therapy can also be made harder through the type of prompt given and the task difficulty. Prompts and questions that are opened ended and with broad semantic categories are going to be harder to conceptualize and draw. It is a harder task when the client is asked to draw abstract concepts or sequenced actions/events.

 If a client has deficits in the following areas, drawing therapy might be an appropriate therapy technique:

  Western Aphasia Battery (WAB)
  1. Responsive Speech ("What do you write with?")
  2. Spontaneous Speech
       a. Conversational questions
       b. Picture descriptions

  Boston Diagnostic Aphasia Examination (BDAE)
  1. Oral expression (word reading, sentence reading)
  2. Written section (writing to dictation, writing to describe a picture)

Overall, drawing therapy offers a means of accessing language to patients with aphasia who have difficulty expressing themselves with different modalities.

== Assessment ==
For most patients, formal and informal language assessments are initially administered during his/her acute hospital stay by a licensed speech-language pathologist. However, a standardized assessment may provide further information regarding an aphasia classification. While there are different classifications of aphasia (i.e., Broca's, Wernicke's, Conduction, Anomia), they each have hallmark deficits. Research has shown, a patient presenting with mixed transcortical aphasia will have impairments in all communicative areas, with the exception of the preserved ability to repeat a person's words or phrases. Patients with mixed transcortical aphasia demonstrate similar deficits as those seen in patients with global aphasia. Therefore, assessment of repetition is most critical in order to differentially diagnose. Specifically, language based standardized assessments such as the Western Aphasia Battery (WAB), and the Folstein Mini Mental State Exam include a repetition subtest amongst all other language-related areas.

Other possible assessments that can provide further differentiation include: Magnetic Resonance Imaging (MRI) Magnetic Resonance Angiography (MRA) CT scan Informal observation

It is important to remain diligent in providing therapy regardless of aphasia classification.

== Prognosis ==
If brain damage is minimal then a patient may recover language skills over time without treatment, however if the damage is severe it may be necessary to receive speech and language therapy. Recovery from this type of brain injury is a slow process and very few patients regain the same level of language and communication skills that they have before the injury. Patients with aphasia usually undergo speech therapy where they relearn and practice supplementary communication methods. Speech therapy is not a cure for the aphasia, but instead helps patients use skills that remain intact. When considering the prognosis for individuals with aphasia it is necessary to consider internal factors, patient specific factors, and external factors as these factors are considered most critical to post-stroke recovery. Internal factors are factors related to the stroke such as aphasia severity, lesion site and lesion size. Individuals with milder forms of aphasia, lesions that insignificantly impact language function and smaller lesions tend to have a higher degree of aphasia recovery. Lesions in the superior temporal gyrus (STG) produce a more persistent global aphasia, which is associated with poor aphasia recovery. Patient specific factors relate to the patient's age of onset, education level and motivation for recovery. Younger patients have been reported to demonstrate a higher recovery rate than older patients. Those with more years of education are less vulnerable to language disruption by stroke. External factors include environmental factors such as type and amount of language treatment provided. Stroke patients who are generally aware of their handicap and receive good support show more motivation and are more likely to have a better outcome.
