= MRC Cognition and Brain Sciences Unit =

Branch of the UK Medical Research Council, based in Cambridge

Coordinates: 52.1926°N 0.1192°E

The Cognition and Brain Sciences Unit is a branch of the UK Medical Research Council, based in Cambridge, England. The CBSU is a centre for cognitive neuroscience, with a mission to improve human health by understanding and enhancing cognition and behaviour in health, disease and disorder. It is one of the largest and most long-lasting contributors to the development of psychological theory and practice.

The CBSU has its own magnetic resonance imaging (MRI, 3T) scanner on-site, as well as a 306-channel magnetoencephalography (MEG) system and a 128-channel electroencephalography (EEG) laboratory.

The CBSU has close links to clinical neuroscience research in the University of Cambridge Medical School. Over 140 scientists, students, and support staff work in research areas such as Memory, Attention, Emotion, Speech and Language, Development and Aging, Computational Modelling and Neuroscience Methods. With dedicated facilities available on site, the Unit has particular strengths in the application of neuroimaging techniques in the context of well-developed neuro-cognitive theory.

== History ==
The unit was established in 1944 as the MRC Applied Psychology Unit. In June 2001, the History of Modern Biomedicine Research Group held a witness seminar to gather information on the unit's history.

On 1 July 2017, the CBU was merged with the University of Cambridge. Coming under the Clinical School, the unit is still funded by the British government through Research Councils UK but is managed and maintained by Cambridge University.

In April 2027, the MRC Cognition and Brain Sciences Unit will become the Cambridge Mind and Brain Institute.

== List of directors ==
- Kenneth Craik, 1944–1945
- Frederic Bartlett, 1945–1951
- Norman Mackworth, 1951–1958
- Donald Broadbent, 1958–1974
- Alan Baddeley, 1974–1997
- William Marslen-Wilson, 1997–2010
- Susan Gathercole, 2011–2018
- Matthew Lambon Ralph, 2018–
