= Doors and People =

Doors and People is a neuropsychological test of memory developed as a memory battery (Baddeley, Emslie and Nimmo-Smith, 1994). The test takes about 35–45 minutes to complete and can be administered on individuals aged between 18 and 80 years old. It consists of four main categories: doors, people, shapes and names. The doors category tests visual recognition by showing the participant a variety of different coloured doors which they must remember and later recognise from a selection of similar doors. The people category tests verbal recall where the participant must remember and recall four names of different people both immediately and after a delay. The shapes category tests visual recall by asking the participant to copy four different patterns and then recall them from memory. Finally, the name category tests verbal recognition by asking the participant to read a collection of different names and then recognise them amongst a collection of four name items.

Generally, the Doors and People test has been shown as a good standardised test of memory which is both enjoyable and easy to complete. Also, it had good face validity, and normative data is available. However, the test is limited because it has no parallel form. Furthermore, it is time-consuming, is culturally biased, has low ecological validity and has a complex scoring system.

== Literature ==
- MacPherson SE, Turner MS, Bozzali M, Cipolotti L, Shallice T: The Doors and People Test: The effect of frontal lobe lesions on recall and recognition memory performance. Neuropsychology. 2016 Mar;30(3):332-7. doi: 10.1037/neu0000240.
