= Phases of speech =

In a simple form of communication between two people, such as a short dialog, the speaker's utterance and transmission of speech sounds (or speech signal) to the hearer encompass seven phases of speech, namely:

- neurolinguistic programming
- neuromuscular phase
- organic phase
- aerodynamic phase
- acoustic phase
- neuroreceptive phase
- neurolinguistic identification.
