= Memory rehearsal =

Memory rehearsal is a term for the role of repetition in the retention of memories. It involves repeating information over and over in order to get the information processed and stored as a memory.

== Types ==
=== Maintenance rehearsal ===
Maintenance rehearsal is a type of memory rehearsal that is useful in maintaining information in short-term memory or working memory. Because this usually involves repeating information without thinking about its meaning or connecting it to other information, the information is not usually transferred to long-term memory. An example of maintenance rehearsal would be repeating a phone number mentally, or aloud until the number is entered into the phone to make the call. The number is held in working memory long enough to make the call, but never transferred to long-term memory. An hour, or even five minutes after the call, the phone number will no longer be remembered.

In 1972, Craik and Lockhart proposed that memory recall involves multiple processes operating at different levels. Maintenance rehearsal involves repeatedly processing an item at the same level, which requires little attention. It has the potential to improve immediate recall, but has little effect in recall in long-term memory. Depending on the information that needs to be processed determines which route of recall an individual will use. For example, if the information only needs to be used temporarily, a person will use maintenance rehearsal in working memory. However, if the information needs to be used at a later date, most likely a person will use elaborative rehearsal. In elaborative rehearsal, the information is processed at a deeper level and has the ability to move to long-term memory. In a literature review, researchers proposed a hypothesis that "Information entering working memory from the visual external world is processed by structures in the parietal and temporal lobes specialized for perceptual processing".

Maintenance rehearsal has the potential to assist in long-term memory in certain situations. In a previous study, researchers looked at the difference in recall for a set of words between participants who knew they were going to be asked to recall the words, in which they repeated the words multiple times and the participants who did not know they were going to recall the words, in which they only repeated the words once (Baddeley, 2009). The group that were told they would have to recall the words at a later date did significantly better than those who were not told they would have to recall (Baddeley, 2009). There is also a positive correlation between the meaningfulness of words and how much an individual will remember them (Baddeley, 2009). The more meaning an individual associates with a certain word or a list of words, the more likely and easier it will be for them to remember them if asked to repeat them at a later date.

There can be differences in which younger and older children rehearse. Dempster (1981) reports that in younger children, they tend to only rehearse one item at a time. This helps them be able to remember the item without the clutter of other items. The developmental age of the child could also play a role in the number a child is able to remember and rehearse. The older a child is, the more items they can rehearse at once.

In many ways, maintenance rehearsal is useful, such as when people look at a phone number and need to replicate it in a few seconds. But for information that needs more attention and better processing, maintenance rehearsal is only a temporary fix. Individuals should use other processing techniques and elaborative rehearsal to help move information from working to long-term memory.

Working memory is commonly cited as more of a process than an actual storage and is critical to the ability to maintain and manipulate information in one's mind. Because of its importance to cognition, working memory is responsible for that novel information that has immediate importance, but is not needed so much that it is committed to permanent storage in long-term memory. In this way, it exists somewhere in an area between short-term and long-term memory.

The phonological loop is a concept implicated in maintenance rehearsal and is very much a function of working memory. It is composed of two parts: a short-term store, and an articulatory rehearsal process that both work to constantly refresh subvocal memorization. The capacity of the phonological loop is not large, only being able to hold around seven items, but is very dependent on subvocal rehearsal to refresh the memory traces of those items so that they temporarily stay in storage. Similarly, subvocal rehearsal is dependent upon the short-term store in that it is where the information for the phonological loop is found. In this way, both processes of the phonological loop directly rely on one another to complete the process.

In regard to learning theory, the phonological loop has been found to be especially effective when visual information is paired with auditory information. For instance, if one were to read a set of information and listen to it being read audibly, they are more likely to remember it than if they were to simply read it without the audio to supplement it. In this way, it is true that the maintenance rehearsal is most beneficial with rote memorization; however, it can be used as a tool for learning particularly when paired with other modes.

=== Elaborative rehearsal ===
Elaborative rehearsal is a type of memory rehearsal that is useful in transferring information into long-term memory. This type of rehearsal is effective because it involves thinking about the meaning of the information and connecting it to other information already stored in memory. It goes much deeper than maintenance rehearsal.

According to the levels-of-processing effect by Fergus I. M. Craik and Robert S. Lockhart in 1972, this type of rehearsal works best because of this depth of processing.

In addition to processing novel information in which the meaning behind the information is enough to transfer it to long-term memory, another way that elaborative rehearsal works is by associating new information with information that is already held in long-term memory. This approach requires the learner to engage with new information in a way that creates meaningful connections to previously-learned things, thus leading to the new information also being committed to long-term memory.

An effective way of encouraging elaborative rehearsal is by engaging with the material in more than one way. For instance, discussion or study groups provide an opportunity to make discrete pieces of information more personal by attaching stories to them and creating meaningful connections to things already learned. Elaborative rehearsal has strong support in learning, especially in its attention to meaningful connections across different concepts and pieces of information. More specifically, elaborative rehearsal is extremely beneficial when remembering larger pieces of information such as sentences or other larger chunks.

== Baddeley's model ==
In the Baddeley's model of working memory, this ability comprises a central executive and two buffers – the phonological loop and the visuospatial sketch pad. Both storage buffers are characterized by passive storage and rehearsal information. This rehearsal function has been associated with frontal networks such as the Broca's area. More specifically, subvocal rehearsal and verbal maintenance are associated with the posterior left precentral gyrus. The temporary storage of the phonological loop is often attributed to the supramarginal gyrus in the parietal lobe.

== See also ==
- Cognitivism
- Rehearsal
- Rehearsal (educational psychology)
