= Atkinson–Shiffrin memory model =

Model of human memory

The Atkinson–Shiffrin model (also known as the multi-store model or modal model) is a model of memory proposed in 1968 by Richard Atkinson and Richard Shiffrin. The model asserts that human memory has three separate components:

1. a sensory register, where sensory information enters memory,
2. a short-term store, also called working memory or short-term memory, which receives and holds input from both the sensory register and the long-term store, and
3. a long-term store, where information which has been rehearsed (explained below) in the short-term store is held indefinitely.

== Summary ==
Multi-store model: Atkinson and Shiffrin's (1968) original model of memory, consisting of the sensory register, short-term store, and long-term store.

The model of memories is an explanation of how memory processes work. The three-part, multi-store model was first described by Atkinson and Shiffrin in 1968, though the vague idea of distinct memory stores was by no means a new idea at the time. William James described a distinction between primary and secondary memory in 1890, where primary memory consisted of thoughts held for a short time in consciousness and secondary memory consisted of a permanent, unconscious store. But at the time the parsimony of separate memory stores was a contested notion. A summary of the evidence given for the distinction between long-term and short-term stores is given below. Additionally, Atkinson and Shiffrin included a sensory register alongside the previously theorized primary and secondary memory, as well as a variety of control processes which regulate the transfer of memory.

Following its first publication, multiple extensions of the model have been put forth such as a precategorical acoustic store, the search of associative memory model, the perturbation model, and permastore. Additionally, alternative frameworks have been proposed, such as procedural reinstatement, a distinctiveness model, and Baddeley and Hitch's model of working memory, among others.

== Sensory register ==
When an environmental stimulus is detected by the senses, it is briefly available in what Atkinson and Shiffrin called the sensory registers (also sensory buffers or sensory memory). Though this store is generally referred to as "the sensory register" or "sensory memory", it is actually composed of multiple registers, one for each sense. The sensory registers do not process the information carried by the stimulus, but rather detect and hold information for milliseconds to seconds to be used in short-term memory. For this reason Atkinson and Shiffrin also called the registers "buffers", as they prevent immense amounts of information from overwhelming higher-level cognitive processes. Information is only transferred to the short-term memory when attention is given to it, otherwise it decays rapidly and is forgotten.

While it is generally agreed that there is a sensory register for each sense, most of the research in the area has focused on the visual and auditory systems.

=== Iconic memory ===
Iconic memory, which is associated with the visual system, is perhaps the most researched of the sensory registers. The original evidence suggesting sensory stores which are separate to short-term and long-term memory was experimentally demonstrated for the visual system using a tachistoscope.

Iconic memory is only limited to field of vision. That is, as long as a stimulus has entered the field of vision there is no limit to the amount of visual information iconic memory can hold at any one time. As noted above, sensory registers do not allow for further processing of information, and as such iconic memory only holds information for visual stimuli such as shape, size, color and location (but not semantic meaning). As the higher-level processes are limited in their capacities, not all information from sensory memory can be conveyed. It has been argued that the momentary mental freezing of visual input allows for the selection of specific aspects which should be passed on for further memory processing. The biggest limitation of iconic memory is the rapid decay of the information stored there; items in iconic memory decay after only 0.5–1.0 seconds.

=== Echoic memory ===
Echoic memory, coined by Ulric Neisser, refers to information that is registered by the auditory system. As with iconic memory, echoic memory only holds superficial aspects of sound (e.g. pitch, tempo, or rhythm) and it has a nearly limitless capacity. Echoic memory is generally cited as having a duration of between 1.5 and 5 seconds depending on context but has been shown to last up to 20 seconds in the absence of competing information.

== Short-term store ==
While much of the information in sensory memory decays and is forgotten, some is attended to. The information that is attended is transferred to the short-term store (also short-term memory, working memory; note that while these terms are often used interchangeably they were not originally intended to be used as such).

=== Duration ===
As with sensory memory, the information that enters short-term memory decays and is lost, but the information in the short-term store has a longer duration, approximately 18–20 seconds when the information is not being actively rehearsed, though it is possible that this depends on modality and could be as long as 30 seconds. Fortunately, the information can be held in the short-term store for much longer through what Atkinson and Shiffrin called rehearsal. For auditory information rehearsal can be taken in a literal sense: continually repeating the items. However, the term can be applied for any information that is attended to, such as when a visual image is intentionally held in mind. Finally, information in the short-term store does not have to be of the same modality as its sensory input. For example, written text which enters visually can be held as auditory information, and likewise auditory input can be visualized. On this model, rehearsal of information allows for it to be stored more permanently in the long-term store. Atkinson and Shiffrin discussed this at length for auditory and visual information but did not give much attention to the rehearsal/storage of other modalities due to the experimental difficulties of studying those modalities.

=== Capacity ===
There is a limit to the amount of information that can be held in the short-term store: 5 - 9 chunks. These chunks, which were noted by Miller in his seminal paper The Magical Number Seven, Plus or Minus Two, are defined as independent items of information. Some chunks are perceived as one unit though they could be broken down into multiple items, for example "1066" can be either the series of four digits "1, 0, 6, 6" or the semantically grouped item "1066" which is the year the Battle of Hastings was fought. Chunking allows for large amounts of information to be held in memory: 149283141066 is twelve individual items, well outside the limit of the short-term store, but it can be grouped semantically into the 4 chunks "Columbus[1492] ate[8] pie[314→3.14→π] at the Battle of Hastings[1066]". Because short-term memory is limited in capacity, it severely limits the amount of information that can be attended to at any one time.

== Long-term store ==
The long-term store (also long-term memory) is a more or less permanent store. Information that is stored here can be "copied" and transferred to the short-term store where it can be attended to and manipulated.

=== Transfer from STS ===
Information is postulated to enter the long-term store from the short-term store more or less automatically. According to Atkinson and Shiffrin model, transfer from the short-term store to the long-term store is occurring for as long as the information is being attended to in the short-term store. In this way, varying amounts of attention result in varying amounts of time in short-term memory. Ostensibly, the longer an item is held in short-term memory, the stronger its memory trace will be in long-term memory. Atkinson and Shiffrin cite evidence for this transfer mechanism in studies by Hebb (1961) and Melton (1963) which show that repeated rote repetition enhances long-term memory. One may also think to the original Ebbinghaus memory experiments showing that forgetting increases for items which are studied fewer times. Finally, the authors note that there are stronger encoding processes than simple rote rehearsal, namely relating the new information to information which has already made its way into the long-term store.

=== Capacity and duration ===
In this model, as with most models of memory, long-term memory is assumed to be nearly limitless in its duration and capacity. It is most often the case that brain structures begin to deteriorate and fail before any limit of learning is reached. This is not to assume that any item which is stored in long-term memory is accessible at any point in the lifetime. Rather, it is noted that the connections, cues, or associations to the memory deteriorate; the memory remains intact but unreachable.

== Evidence for distinct stores ==
At the time of the original publication there was a schism in the field of memory on the issue of a single process or dual-process model of memory, the two processes referring to short-term and long-term memory. Atkinson and Shiffrin cite hippocampal lesion studies as compelling evidence for a separation of the two stores. These studies showed that patients with bilateral damage to the hippocampal region had nearly no ability to form new long-term memories though their short-term memory remained intact. One may also be familiar with similar evidence found through the study of Henry Molaison, famously known as H.M., who underwent a severe bilateral medial temporal lobectomy which removed most of his hippocampal regions. These data suggest that there is indeed a clear separation between the short-term and long-term stores.

== Criticism ==
=== Sensory register as a separate store ===
One of the early and central criticisms to the Atkinson–Shiffrin model was the inclusion of the sensory registers as part of memory. Specifically, the original model seemed to describe the sensory registers as both a structure and a control process. Parsimony would suggest that if the sensory registers are actually control processes, there is no need for a tri-partite system. Later revisions to the model addressed these claims and incorporated the sensory registers with the short-term store.

=== Division and nature of working memory ===
Baddeley and Hitch have in turn called into question the specific structure of the short-term store, proposing that it is subdivided into multiple components. While the different components were not specifically addressed in the original Atkinson-Shiffrin model, the authors do note that little research has been done investigating the different ways sensory modalities may be represented in the short-term store. Thus the model of working memory given by Baddeley and Hitch should be viewed as a refinement of the original model.

=== Rehearsal as the sole transfer mechanism ===
The model has been further criticized as suggesting that rehearsal is the key process that initiates and facilitates transfer of information into LTM. There is very little evidence supporting this hypothesis, and long-term recall can in fact be better predicted by a levels-of-processing framework. In this framework, items which are encoded at a deeper, more semantic level are shown to have stronger traces in long-term memory. This criticism is somewhat unfounded as Atkinson and Shiffrin clearly state a difference between rehearsal and coding, where coding is akin to elaborative processes which levels-of-processing would call deep-processing. In this light, the levels-of-processing framework could be seen as more of an extension of the Atkinson-Shiffrin model rather than a refutation.

=== Division of long-term memory ===
In the case of long-term memory it is unlikely that different types of information, such as the motor skills to ride a bike, memory for vocabulary, and memory for personal life events are stored in the same fashion. Endel Tulving notes the importance of encoding specificity in long-term memory. To clarify, there are definite differences in the way information is stored depending on whether it is episodic (memories of events), procedural (knowledge of how to do things), or semantic (general knowledge). A short (non-inclusive) example comes from the study of Henry Molaison (H.M.): learning a simple motor task (tracing a star pattern in a mirror), which involves implicit and procedural long-term storage, is unaffected by bilateral lesioning of the hippocampal regions while other forms of long-term memory, like vocabulary learning (semantic) and memories for events, are severely impaired.

=== Further reading ===
For more thorough and technical reviews of the main criticisms please refer to the following resources:

- Raaijmakers, Jeroen G. W. (1993). "The story of the two-store model of memory: past criticisms, current status, and future directions". Attention and performance. Vol. XIV (silver jubilee volume). Cambridge, MA: MIT Press. pp. 467–488. ISBN 978-0-262-13284-8.
- Baddeley, Alan (April 1994). "The magical number seven: still magic after all these years?". Psychological Review. 101 (2): 353–356. doi:10.1037/0033-295X.101.2.353. PMID 8022967.

== Search of associative memory (SAM) ==
Due to the above and other criticism through the 1970s, the original model underwent many revisions to account for phenomena it could not explain. The "search of associative memory" (SAM) model is the culmination of that work. The SAM model uses a two-phase memory system: short- and long-term stores. Unlike the original Atkinson–Shiffrin model, there is no sensory store in the SAM model.

=== Short-term store ===
Short-term store takes on the form of a buffer, which has a limited capacity. The model assumes a buffer rehearsal system in which the buffer has a size, r. Items enter the short-term store and accompany other items that are already present in the buffer, until size r has been reached. Once the buffer is at full capacity, when new items enter, they replace an item, r, which already exists in the buffer. A probability of 1/r determines which already existing item will be replaced from the buffer. In general, items that have been in the buffer for longer are more likely to be replaced by new items.

=== Long-term store ===
The long-term store is responsible for storing relationships between different items and of items to their contexts. Context information refers to the situational and temporal factors present at the time when an item is in the short-term store, such as emotional feelings or environmental details. The amount of item-context information which is transferred to the long-term store is proportional to the amount of time that the item remains in the short-term store. On the other hand, the strength of the item-item associations is proportional to the amount of time that two items simultaneously existed in the short-term store.

=== Retrieval from long-term store ===
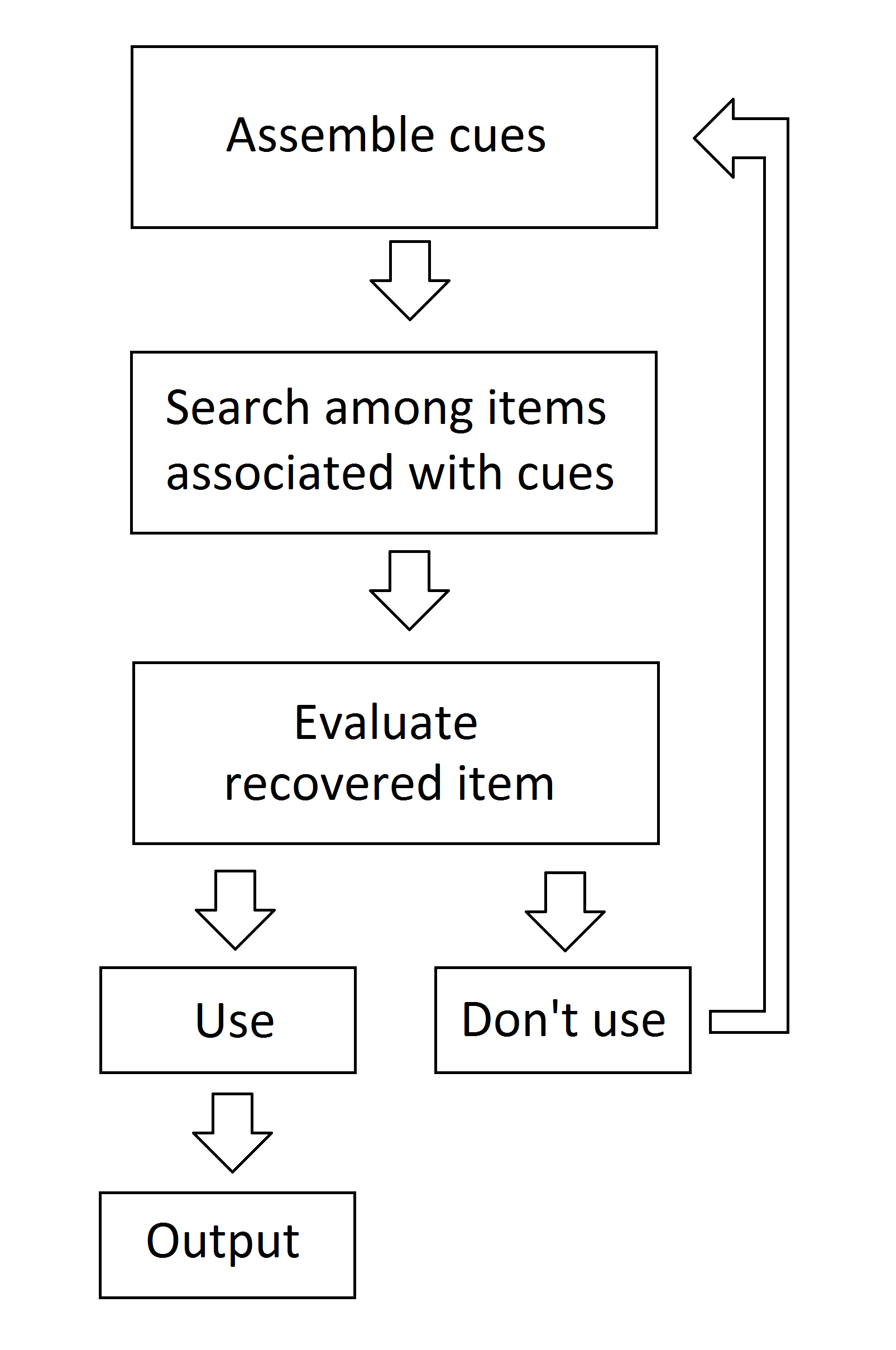
Simplified diagram of the steps involved in retrieving an item from the long-term store under the SAM model. Simplification of the diagram found in Raaijmakers & Shiffrin, 1981.

It is best to show how items are recalled from the long-term store using an example. Assume a participant has just studied a list of word pairs and is now being tested on his memory of those pairs. If the prior list contained, blanket – ocean, the test would be to recall ocean when prompted with blanket – ?.

Memories stored in long-term store are retrieved through a logical process involving the assembly of cues, sampling, recovery, and evaluation of recovery. According to the model, when an item needs to be recalled from memory the individual assembles the various cues for the item in the short-term store. In this case, the cues would be any cues surrounding the pair blanket – ocean, like the words that preceded and followed it, what the participant was feeling at the time, how far into the list the words were, etc.

Using these cues the individual determines which area of the long-term store to search and then samples any items with associations to the cues. This search is automatic and unconscious, which is how the authors would explain how an answer "pops" into one's head. The items which are eventually recovered, or recalled, are those with the strongest associations to the cue item, here blanket. Once an item has been recovered it is evaluated, here the participant would decide whether blanket – [recovered word] matches blanket – ocean. If there is a match, or if the participant believes there is a match, the recovered word is output. Otherwise the search starts from the beginning using different cues or weighting cues differently if possible.

=== Recency effects ===
The usefulness of the SAM model and in particular its model of the short-term store is often demonstrated by its application to the recency effect in free recall. When serial-position curves are applied to SAM, a strong recency effect is observed, but this effect is strongly diminished when a distractor, usually arithmetic, is placed in between study and test trials. The recency effect occurs because items at the end of the test list are likely to still be present in short-term store and therefore retrieved first. However, when new information is processed, this item enters the short-term store and displaces other information from it. When a distracting task is given after the presentation of all items, information from this task displaces the last items from short-term store, resulting in a substantial reduction of recency.

=== Problems for the SAM model ===
The SAM model faces serious problems in accounting for long-term recency data and long-range contiguity data. While both of these effects are observed, the short-term store cannot account for the effects. Since a distracting task after the presentation of word pairs or large interpresentation intervals filled with distractors would be expected to displace the last few studied items from the short-term store, recency effects are still observed. According to the rules of the short-term store, recency and contiguity effects should be eliminated with these distractors as the most recently studied items would no longer be present in the short-term memory. Currently, the SAM model competes with single-store free recall models of memory, such as the Temporal Context Model.

Additionally, the original model assumes that the only significant associations between items are those formed during the study portion of an experiment. In other words, it does not account for the effects of prior knowledge about to-be-studied items. A more recent extension of the model incorporates various features which allow the model to account for memory store for the effects of prior semantic knowledge and prior episodic knowledge. The extension proposes a store for preexisting semantic associations; a contextual drift mechanism allowing for decontextualisation of knowledge, e.g. if you first learned a banana was a fruit because you put it in the same class as apple, you do not always have to think of apples to know bananas are fruits; a memory search mechanism that uses both episodic and semantic associations, as opposed to a unitary mechanism; and a large lexicon including both words from prior lists and unpresented words.
