= Graham Hitch =

English psychologist

- Born: Graham James Hitch
- Education: University of Cambridge (PhD)
- Known for: Working memory
- Scientific career
- Fields: Memory; Cognitive psychology
- Workplaces: University of York; University of Sussex; University of Manchester; Lancaster University; University of Stirling
- Thesis: Organisation and retrieval in immediate memory (1972)
- Website: www.york.ac.uk/psychology/staff/academicstaff/gjh3/

Graham James Hitch is an English psychologist. He is emeritus professor of psychology at the University of York, best known for his work with Alan Baddeley in developing a Working Memory Model.

== Education ==
He gained a Bachelor of Arts degree in Physics from the University of Cambridge, before gaining a Master of Science degree in Experimental Psychology from the University of Sussex. He then returned to Cambridge to complete his PhD in 1972.

== Career and research ==
He has worked as a research fellow at the University of Sussex (1971–1972) and the University of Stirling (1972–1974), and as a scientist on the Medical Research Council of the Applied Psychology Unit based in Cambridge (1974–1979). He has more recently been employed as a lecturer at the University of Manchester (1979–1990), and as a professor at the University of Lancaster (1991–2000), before moving to the University of York in 2000.
