= Alan Baddeley =

British psychologist (born 1934)

Alan Baddeley CBE FRS
- Born: Alan David Baddeley; 23 March 1934 (age 92); Leeds, Yorkshire, England
- Education: University College London; Princeton University; University of Cambridge (PhD)
- Known for: Neuropsychological tests, Baddeley's model of working memory
- Scientific career
- Workplaces: University of York
- Thesis: The Influence of Acoustic and Semantic Similarity on Long-term Memory for Word Sequences (1962)

Alan David Baddeley CBE FRS (born 23 March 1934) is a British psychologist. He is known for his research on memory and for developing the three-component model of working memory. He is a professor of psychology at the University of York.

== Biography ==
Baddeley was born in Leeds, Yorkshire on 23 March 1934. He lived there with his parents, Donald and Nellie Baddeley, until leaving for university. He decided to study psychology and was originally interested in psychoanalysis. Later he changed his focus to evidence-based psychology. In 1956, Baddeley went to the United States of America to continue his studies. After spending a year in America, he returned home. He then went to Cambridge, where he met and married Hilary Ann White. Baddeley and his wife have three sons.

Baddeley has taught and conducted research at University of Sussex, University of Stirling, MRC Applied Psychology Unit, Churchill College, University of Cambridge, and University of Bristol. He is currently a professor of psychology at the University of York.

== Education ==
Baddeley attended the University College London from 1953 to 1956. He then obtained an MA from Princeton University's Department of Psychology in 1957. He earned a PhD from University of Cambridge in 1962. He has been awarded Honorary Doctorates by University of Essex in 1999, Plymouth University in 2000, and University of Bristol in 2019.

== Career and research ==
In 1974, working with Graham Hitch, Baddeley developed an influential model of working memory called Baddeley's model of working memory, which argues for the existence of multiple short-term memory stores and a separate interacting system for manipulating the content of these stores. There are three components of this model: the phonological loop, the central executive, and the visuospatial sketch pad. In 2000, Baddeley suggested adding a fourth component to his memory model called the episodic buffer. The model accounts for much of the empirical data on short-term retention and manipulation of information. His landmark study in 1975 on the capacity of short-term memory showed that people remembered more short words than long words in a recall test. This was called the word length effect and it demonstrated that pronunciation time rather than number of items determines the capacity of verbal short-term memory. This study also found that when participants repeated an irrelevant sound while reading the words, the word length effect does not happen.

Working with Barbara Wilson, Baddeley also did several important studies on amnesia and memory. They studied patients with temporal lobe damage that caused memory problems. Results of such studies provide evidence that short-term and long-term memory are not one system. The amnesia patients had normal short-term memory but impaired long-term memory.

Baddeley has also done research studies using divers and various underwater conditions. He studied the effects of depth and pressure on dexterity, the impact of temperature on response time, and context-dependent memory on land and underwater.

Baddeley was the director of the Cognition and Brain Sciences Unit, a branch of the UK Medical Research Council, based in Cambridge, from 1974 - 1997. He was elected a Fellow of the Royal Society in 1993 and in 1996, was elected a Foreign Honorary Member of the American Academy of Arts and Sciences. In 2001, Baddeley received the American Psychological Association (APA) Award for Distinguished Scientific Contributions. Baddeley was given the Lifetime Achievement Award by the British Psychological Society in 2012. He also received the Major Advancement in Psychological Science Prize from the International Union of Psychological Science in 2016.

=== Other notable works ===
Baddeley has also part authored a number of neuropsychological tests including the Doors and People, Children's Test of Nonword Repetition (CN REP), the Rivermead Behavioural Memory Test (RBMT), Autobiographical Memory Interview (AMI), Visual Patterns Test (VPT) and the Speed and Capacity of Language Processing Test (SCOLP).

Baddeley was involved in the design of United Kingdom postcodes, and was one of the founders of the European Society for Cognitive Psychology.
