= Memory and retention in learning =

Mental processes

Model of the Memory Process

Human memory is the process in which information and material is encoded, stored and retrieved in the brain. Memory is a property of the central nervous system, with three different classifications: short-term, long-term and sensory memory. The three types of memory have specific, different functions but each are equally important for memory processes. Sensory information is transformed and encoded in a certain way in the brain, which forms a memory representation. This unique coding of information creates a memory.

Memory and retention are linked because any retained information is kept in human memory stores, therefore without human memory processes, retention of material would not be possible. In addition, memory and the process of learning are also closely connected. Memory is a site of storage and enables the retrieval and encoding of information, which is essential for the process of learning. Learning is dependent on memory processes because previously stored knowledge functions as a framework in which newly learned information can be linked.

Information is retained in human memory stores in different ways, but it is primarily done so through active learning, repetition and recall. Information that is encoded and stored within memory stores can often be forgotten. There are multiple explanations for why this happens. These include: ineffective encoding of material, decay of information, interference, competition of newly learned material and retrieval failure. There are multiple ways of improving the abilities of human memory and retention when engaging in learning. These depend on the nature of how the information was originally encoded into memory stores, and whether the stored material is regularly retrieved and recalled. Human memory has been studied throughout history, and there is extensive literature available to help understand its complexity.

Recent research in cognitive psychology emphasizes that actively engaging with learned material, rather than passively reviewing it, can significantly improve long-term retention. One of the most effective strategies that has been identified by researchers is retrieval practice, also known as the testing effect, which strengthens memory through the act of recall.

== Types of memory ==
=== Long-term ===
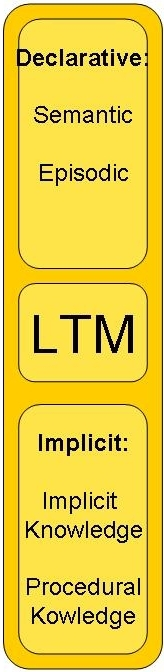
Types of Long-term Memory

Long-term memory is the site for which information such as facts, physical skills and abilities, procedures and semantic material are stored. Long-term memory is important for the retention of learned information, allowing for a genuine understanding and meaning of ideas and concepts. In comparison to short-term memory, the storage capacity of long-term memory can last for days, months, years or for an entire lifetime. Long term memory can still be forgotten so the information that is held here is constantly changing over time. Long-term memory has three components. Procedural memory is responsible for guiding how we perform certain tasks and providing the knowledge of how to do things, such as walking or talking. Semantic memory is responsible for providing general world knowledge through the information we have accumulated over our lives. Episodic memory is responsible for storing autobiographical events that we have personally experienced, which can be stated explicitly.

=== Short-term ===
Short-term memory is responsible for retaining and processing information very temporarily. It is the information that we are currently aware of thinking about. Short term memory is also known as the working memory. The storage capacity and duration of short-term memory is very limited; information can be lost easily with distraction. A famous paper written by psychologist George Miller in 1956 analyses this concept further. Miller wrote how short-term memory only has the ability to process or hold seven, plus or minus two items at a time, which then expires after roughly 30 seconds. This is due to short-term memory only having a certain number of "slots" in which to store information in. Short term memory allows us to remember 7–8 sections of information. An example would be a phone number or a sequence of words in a sentence. Despite the quick disappearance of information, short-term memory is an essential step for retaining information in long-term memory stores. Without it, information would not be able to be relayed into long-term memory.

=== Sensory ===
Sensory memory is thought of as a process of perception provided by the human senses. Sensory memory retains the information perfectly and accurately for a few hundred milliseconds. As the retention of information only lasts for such a short amount of time, this type of memory is often thought of as being a part of the process of perception instead of memory. Iconic memory and echoic memory are categories of sensory memory, and relay literal copies of sensory events to our memory. Iconic memory relays visual information and echoic memory relays auditory information. Both types of memory have an unlimited capacity, but have a very short duration; iconic memory lasts for 50-500 milliseconds and echoic memory lasts for 8–10 seconds.

== Factors Affecting Information Transfer ==
There are four main factors that influence the transfer of information from short term memory to long term memory:

1. Emotional State: we learned best when we are alert, motivated, surprised, and aroused due to the release of Norepinephrine which controls the memory of emotionally charges events
2. Rehearsal: Repeating information enhances memory
3. Association: Comparing new and old information helps us remember facts
4. Automatic memory: impressions in long term memory that are not consciously formed

== How information is learned and retained in memory ==
Processes of memory and learning are very interconnected and are often considered as the same. Psychologists however determine these as two distinct processes. Learning can be defined as the acquisition of relative knowledge gained through experience or studying, which can permanently modify a behaviour. Memory can be defined as the ability to remember previous experiences. Memory is essential for learning new information, as it functions as a site for storage and retrieval of learned knowledge. Two categories of long-term memory are used when engaging in learning. The first kind is procedural: how-to processes, and the second is declarative: specific information that can be recalled and reported.

There are many different ways of retaining information in memory. Acquiring and retaining new knowledge relies on the formation of associations created in memory stores. Memory relies on the creation of associations, just as the creation of associations relies on memory when encoding and retaining new material. The retention and retrieval of information in memory requires the information to be firmly embedded within a neural network; which can be done so through traditional methods of repetition and connecting new information with old information. The process of repetition facilitates the process within the brain of solidifying connections. When learning new information, the brain seeks to associate this material with previously stored knowledge through assimilation. When we learn something new, our brain creates new neural pathways. Therefore, repetition when engaging in learning is important for retaining this information in long-term memory stores.

Chunking has also proved to be a useful strategy for retaining information. Chunking is the process of grouping together individual items of similarity. By attaching a new name to these groups and remembering the name rather than each item, the amount of information remembered has shown to improve significantly. Through the separation of individual items, it becomes much easier to retain information, as our short-term memory can be so limiting. Overall, chunking enhances the ability of human memory to retain information.

In addition, the recollection of learned information is essential to retaining such material in the long-term. Recall refers to the re-accessing of previously learned information held in long-term memory stores. During this process, the brain relays a specific pattern of neural activity that echoes the original perception of that event. Regular recalling of stored information helps to improve memory retention. The more the material is recalled, the more it becomes engrained within our memory. When we repeatedly think about knowledge we have learned, our brain strengthens the existing neural pathways which embeds this knowledge further within our long-term memory stores.

== Why learned information is forgotten ==
There are many explanations for why we forget learned information. A well-known explanation to explain why this happens is the ineffective encoding of material. This is when material appears to have been forgotten over time, however it is very likely that this material was never encoded into memory stores properly in the first place. This is also referred to as pseudo-forgetting, and it is usually attributable to distractions, or a lack of attention when engaging in learning that lead to ineffective encoding. Neural pathways and memory codes may still have been formed, however subsequent forgetting of learned information implies that it was ineffectively encoded within these pathways.

Another explanation for why we forget learned information is the decay of information. This concept determines the impermanence of memory storage as an explanation for forgetting. Decay theory posits that the process of forgetting is due to the inevitable fading of memory traces over time. For this theory, the length of time that the information has been retained within memory stores is important. Essentially, the memories held in long-term stores start to fade as time passes, particularly if the memories haven't been re-visited.

Interference theory provides another explanation for the forgetting of learned information. New memories interfere with old memories, and limits our ability to recall these over time. There are two types of interference; retroactive and proactive. Retroactive interference is when newly learned information impairs previously retained information, and proactive interference is when previously learned information interferes with newly retained information. Essentially, interference theory posits that stored memories interfere and hamper one another, which is why we forget learned information.

The competition between newly learned information and previously learned information can cause retained information to be forgotten. According to theories, the capacity of our memory stores are finite and can only retain a limited amount of information. Therefore, the creation of newer memories can lead to the destruction or replacement of older memories due to competition of finite memory stores.

Retrieval failure provides another explanation for why we forget learned information. According to this theory, we forget information because it is inaccessible in long-term memory stores. Access to this information depends on retrieval cues, and the absence of these cues causes difficulties in recalling retained information. Forgetting learned information occurs most often when the context and state are very different when encoding and retrieving. In these situations, there are no retrieval cues which can result in cue-dependent forgetting. For example, many people do not remember much about their childhood. However, once returning to an old house or school; which provide retrieval cues, childhood memories usually begin to return. Retrieval failure and an absence in cues can be very influential for forgetting learned information.

== Methods of improving memory and retention ==
There are several methods of improving our memory, and our ability to retain more information when engaging in learning. Chunking is a well-known method of improving memory and retention. In order to effectively chunk information together, connections and relations between the different items must be made. In combination, associating groups of items with things held in memory stores can make this more memorable, and can improve retention.

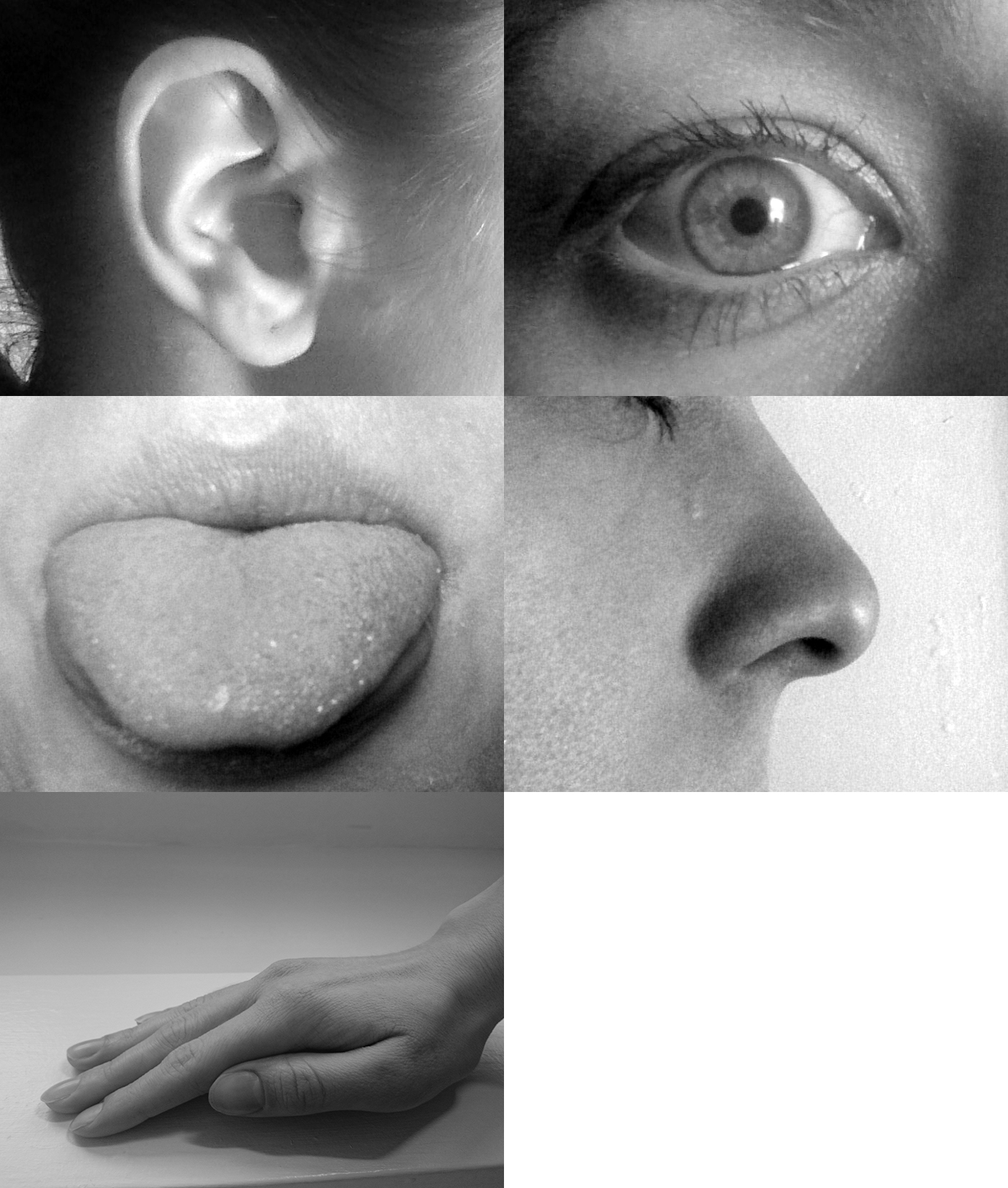
Five Human Senses: Hearing, Sight, Taste, Smell and Touch

Another method for improving memory and retention is imaginative and abstract thinking. Using imagination and thinking abstractly when learning new things are effective ways of improving memory and enabling a great amount of material to be effectively retained. Imagination creates stronger visuals and connections, which can lead to significant improvement in memory and retention. The VAI memory principle: Visualisation, Association and Imagination, improves memory and retention when learning considerably. This principle combines different methods of improving memory and retention to create one comprehensive method for engaging in successful learning.

Other methods of maximising our ability to learn and retain new material is to use as many human senses as possible. These include: sight, touch, smell and hearing. All of these senses should be engaged when learning new information. Research has shown that when engaging as many senses as possible at once, retention of information improves the most.

Deeper processing of the originally learned material results in more effective encoding and retrieval, due to semantic processing having taken place. Semantic processing occurs after we hear information and encode its meaning, allowing for deeper processing. Semantic encoding can therefore lead to greater levels of retention when learning new information. The avoidance of interfering stimuli such as music and technology when learning, can improve memory and retention significantly. These distractions interfere with the encoding of material in long-term memory stores.

Matching retrieval cues when learning new information, to information that has originally been encoded in our brain, has also been shown to improve our memory and retention. Retrieval cues can trigger stored memories, and are important for enhancing learning of new material.

There are many other methods of improving our memory and retention, however these are the most well-known and credible methods.

== The neurobiological foundation of memory retrieval ==
Actively recalling information from memory also leads to stronger and longer-lasting retention than rereading or restudying the same material. This is known as retrieval practice or the testing effect. Research in cognitive psychology has shown that retrieval enhances memory consolidation and strengthens the association between stored information and its retrieval cues. Recent neuroscientific research has provided deeper insights into the mechanisms underlying this process.

Retrieval practice involves the interaction between external sensory or internally generated cues and stored memory traces. This interaction is critical for memory accessibility and to retrieve memories successfully. How effective retrieval is is influenced by the quality of the cues and strength of the memory traces. Practicing retrieval enhances the accessibility of specific memories and also contributes to the stabilization of these memories over time.

The neurobiological foundation of memory retrieval suggests that the mechanisms that are important in forming memory engrams, which are the physical representation of memories in the brain, are closely related to those involved in recovery.

Overall, retrieval practice serves as a powerful tool for enhancing memory retention. By understanding the neurobiological mechanisms involved, people can better utilize this strategy to improve retention and learning.
