= Measurement of memory =

Memory is inferred by comparing how much is remembered or accessed to how much has been forgotten. It is described as the revival of ideas, mental images of object and events from past experiences. In other words, memory is ability to retain and is reproduced when required.

== Introduction ==
The measurement of memory in its various types has always been the favorite subject of psychologists. According to them remembering involves those processes which are essential for memory. Basically, there appears to be three different memory systems.

1. Sensory information storage
2. Short-term memory
3. Long-term memory

As you progress through each of these systems in succession, the content gets more abstract and gets retained for longer and longer periods of time. The 5E's learning cycle shows the best interpretation of how scientists think information is purposefully facilitated to move throughout the brain and between these systems of memory.

== Memory storage ==
=== Sensory information storage ===
This is the first system of memory in which the information is brought to us by our senses and the information is retained as long as it is exposed to our senses. As soon as the sense loses contact with the information, it is vanished from the memory. For example, we see many faces at a metro station and they instantly fade from our memory when we look away. This type of memory is extremely volatile and much gets "lost" in less than a second unless we pay attention to it. Technically speaking, the information received was never "found" or "retrieved" in the first place because sensory input is not stored unless specified. Learn more about that in the next section.

=== Short-term memory ===
The information received by the system remains in it for very short period (i.e. 20 sec or slightly more. The most common use of this is reminders or remembering numbers. After that this information either vanishes or is moved to next system of memory. Short-term memory has limited capacity and is often referred to as "working-memory", however these are not the same. Working memory involves a different part of the brain and allows you to manipulate it after initial storage. The information that travels from sensory memory to short-term memory must pass through the Attention gateway. The filter of attention keeps a check between sensory memory and short-term memory. You cannot skip systems of memory, such as jumping directly from sensory input to long-term memory. Sensory input must be actively relayed and filtered by the thalamus to the cortex for short term memory storage. Olfactory sensory input is the most prevalent in our memory, contrary to the popular belief, as it mostly bypasses the thalamus, and all such information gets encoded directly. If there were no such filter, as with olfaction, all 11 million bits per second of sensory input would flood the brain and make it impossible to think about anything. This "attention gateway" created by the thalamus limits what is recorded to the small portion that you more or less tell it to. This is how focusing works.

=== Long-term memory ===
This system is more permanent and has a virtually unlimited capacity of storage. In this system basic meaning and essence can be stored for hours, days, weeks, and even for years. Much of the information retained here covers the whole life. When required, with appropriate cues, the material is typically retrieved. For studying, in order to maximize information retention, psychologists developed another version (one of many) of the learning cycle:

- Encoding or learning
- Storage or retention
- Recall, retrieval or reproduction
- Recognition

== Views of Ebbinghaus ==
In 1885 Hermann Ebbinghaus carried out a study wherein provided a quantitative measure of retention. For this purpose the designed "Nonsense syllable".... A meaningless three letter unit consisting of vowel between two consonants such as LEP, NOL etc. For obtaining a pure, uncontaminated by the previous learning and association, he used these non-sense syllables.

In these experiments he used himself as a subject and as a result of these experiments, he designed many methods for the training of memory. In the present experiment by the uses of nonsense syllables and meaningful words, subject's ability of retention will be evaluated.

=== Hypothesis ===
Memory regarding the nonsense syllable is poorer as compared to meaningful words.

=== Apparatus and material ===
Memory drum or exposure board. A list of three letter nonsense syllable and a list of meaningful words, each consisting of 12 words.

=== Instructions ===
The subject is seated in front of the drum and the following instructions are given:

- This is a learning experiment and you will be shown a list of meaningful words and later on, a list of nonsense syllable. You will learn by heart with full concentration.
- First the list of meaningful words will be shown to you at two second intervals through the window memory drum.
- After the list has been shown once, you will be required to write the list in the same order.
- If there are spelling mistakes or the orders of the words are not maintained, again the list will be shown to you. After the list is over you will again reproduce the list.
- The experiment will continue till you are able to reproduce the list of three times in the same order consecutively. After your successful reproduction you will be given a 30 minutes rest pause.
- After the pause, the experiment will be repeated with the list of nonsense syllables. In the end you will record your subjective report regarding the experiment.

=== Procedure ===
After the instructions, when the subject was completely relaxed, she was shown a list of meaningful words at two second intervals through the window of memory drum. When the list has been presented once, she was given a paper for reproduction of the list. As there were mistakes in her reproduction, therefore, the experiment was repeated. In the second trial, she committed two mistakes, but in the 3rd, 4th, and 5th trial, she reproduced the list successfully. After the rest pause of 30 minutes, the experiment was carried out with non-sense syllable on the same pattern. Presentation of the list was continued until the criterion of complete mastery was reached. At the end of the experiment, Tables were prepared for comparative study.
