= Haptic memory =

Form of sensory memory specific to touch stimuli

Haptic memory is the form of sensory memory specific to touch stimuli. Haptic memory is used regularly when assessing the necessary forces for gripping and interacting with familiar objects. It may also influence one's interactions with novel objects of an apparently similar size and density. Similar to visual iconic memory, traces of haptically acquired information are short lived and prone to decay after approximately two seconds. Haptic memory is best for stimuli applied to areas of the skin that are more sensitive to touch. Haptics involves at least two subsystems; cutaneous, or everything skin related, and kinesthetic, or joint angle and the relative location of body. Haptics generally involves active, manual examination and is quite capable of processing physical traits of objects and surfaces.

== Overview ==
Perhaps the first experiment conducted to study the phenomenon of haptic memory was that of Bliss, Crane, Mansfield, and Townsend who investigated the characteristics of immediate recall for brief tactile stimuli applied to the hand. The results obtained showed a haptic memory store remarkably similar to the visual memory store suggested by Sperling in 1960, with a capacity of approximately four to five items. Similar to tests of visual sensory memory, it was also found that haptic memory performance was significantly improved with the use of partial report procedures. This particular finding is consistent with more recent research by Gallace in 2008. Bliss et al. interpreted this difference in partial report versus whole report as a sensory form of memory for passively presented tactile stimuli with a high capacity and short duration. Additional support for the short duration of haptic memory comes from studies by Gilson and Baddeley in 1969. According to these studies, memory for stimuli applied to the skin is resilient for approximately ten seconds after removal of the stimulus, even when the individual is engaged in tasks that inhibit verbal rehearsal. After this delay, the memory trace becomes vulnerable to forgetting as it decays from the haptic memory store and begins to rely on a more central memory store. Similar findings were later reported by Miles and Borthwick in 1996, who emphasized the role of tactile interference on discriminability of the target location and the role of central processing resources in consolidation of haptic memory. More recent experimental procedures and technologies such as minielectrode recording devices and transcranial magnetic stimulation have allowed for mapping of brain areas involved in the storage of tactile memories. Implicated in most of these studies is the primary somatosensory cortex. More recent studies have also investigated a broader selection of participants, allowing for the discovery of an intact haptic memory in infants.

== Neuroanatomy ==
Tactile memories are organized somatotopically, following the organization of the somatosensory cortex. This means that areas close on the body surface receive nervous signals from areas that are close together on the brain surface. Several distinct areas of the parietal lobe are responsible for contributing to different aspects of haptic memory. Memory for the properties of stimuli such as roughness, spatial density, and texture involves activation of the parietal operculum. Properties of stimuli such as size and shape, as detected by touch receptors in the skin, are stored in the anterior part of the parietal lobe. Memory for spatial information such as the location of stimuli involves the right superior parietal lobule and temporoparietal junction. Additional neuroimaging data has been provided by studies using microelectrodes implanted in the somatosensory cortex of monkeys. When performing a delayed match to sample task with objects of identical dimensions but different surface features, activity is observed in somatosensory neurons during perception and in the short-term memory for tactile stimuli.

According to a study done by Bruce V. DiMattia, Keith A. Posley and Joaquin M. Fuster, it was found that monkeys were quite capable of concurrent Visual-to-Haptic as well as Haptic-to-Visual crossmodal matching of objects by size, shape and texture. It was also discovered that they were more adept at performing cross modal matching in the Visual-to-Haptic direction.

== Development ==
Memory is important in infancy as it forms the basis for more complex procedures such as learning and reasoning. Studies of haptic memory in infants is particularly useful because it allows researchers to study the more perceptual representation of information as opposed to verbal or semantic aspects. Haptic abilities develop in stages in infants: The last two decades have allowed researchers to study the sensory system of infants which gives an insight to the initial stages of thinking, deciding and reasoning in a human brain.

1. Newborn: Haptic ability develops in the mouth, as it is essential for feeding.
2. 1 month of age: Recognition of texture and shape
3. 2 months of age: Recognition of familiar objects after 30 second delay
4. 4 months of age: Recognize familiar objects after 2 minute delay

Evidence of haptic memory was discovered in infants as young as two months by Myriam Lhote and Arlette Streti, who demonstrated that haptic habituation occurs asymmetrically between the hands of infants, and that differences in haptic memory exist between sexes. For instance, in 2-month-old infants, haptic habituation was found in both the right and the left hand. Babies were able to encode haptically some characteristics or features of objects without visual control with their left hand as well as with their right hand. In the experiment, haptic habituation was formed through an occurred stimuli and at the end, it has seen that even though stimuli was not present, infants still carry on their stimuli habit. It was also shown that infantile haptic memory is robust in that it is somewhat resistant to delays (especially in males). These findings support earlier results by Catherwood, which stated that 8-month-old infants were able to recognize a familiar shape after a five-minute delay. Studies by Millar on congenitally blind and blindfolded children have revealed the importance of movement and body-centered cues in haptic memory. While these cues are important in all individuals, blind children tend to rely on them heavily.

Furthermore, it is proven that our haptic cues and memory affects our visual experience and the two experiences are linked for us to comprehend our surroundings.

== Implicit ==
Implicit memory can be referred to as the subconscious recollection of previously presented information. This type of memory influences one's actions and behaviors without the individual having any awareness of its availability for explicit recall. Implicit memory has been linked to phenomena such as skill acquisition, priming, and classical conditioning. In some cases, tactile information is also remembered implicitly. Evidence for this comes from patients with damage to the right cerebral hemisphere, who, due to their brain damage, are unable to explicitly report any of the qualities of objects held in their left hand when another object is simultaneously presented in their right hand. Despite this fact, when the patients are asked to compare the characteristics of objects presented to either hand, their judgements are influenced by objects previously held in their right hand. This suggests that the patients have some memory for the properties of objects recently removed from their right hand that they are not consciously aware of, and that this memory is affecting their accuracy on subsequent tasks. Similar evidence has been found in healthy individuals of varying ages, and in patients with Alzheimer's disease.

== See also ==
- Sensory memory
- Iconic memory
- Echoic memory
- Olfactory Memory
