= Intermediate-term memory =

Stage of memory in brains

Intermediate-term memory (ITM) is a stage of memory distinct from sensory memory, working memory/short-term memory, and long-term memory. While sensory memory persists for several milliseconds, working memory persists for up to thirty seconds, and long-term memory persists from thirty minutes to the end of an individual's life, intermediate-term memory persists for about two to three hours. This overlap in the durations of these memory processes indicates that they occur simultaneously, rather than sequentially. Indeed, intermediate-term facilitation can be produced in the absence of long-term facilitation. However, the boundaries between these forms of memory are not clear-cut, and they can vary depending on the task. Intermediate-term memory is thought to be supported by the parahippocampal cortex.

In 1993, Rosenzweig and colleagues demonstrated that, in chicks conditioned with an aversive stimulus, percent avoidance of the stimulus (and, by implication, memory of the aversive nature of the stimulus) reached relative minima at one minute, fifteen minutes, and sixty minutes. These dips were theorized to correspond to the time points in which the chicks switched from working memory to intermediate-term memory, from intermediate-term memory to the early phase of long-term memory, and from the early phase of long-term memory to the late phase of long-term memory, respectively—thus demonstrating the presence of a form of memory that exists between working memory and long-term memory, which they referred to as "intermediate-term memory".

Though the idea of intermediate-term memory has existed since the 1990s, Sutton et al. introduced a novel theory for the neural correlates underlying intermediate-term memory in Aplysia in 2001, where they described it as the primary behavioral manifestation of intermediate-term facilitation.

== Characteristics ==
In 2001, Sutton and colleagues proposed that intermediate-term memory possesses the following 3 characteristics:

- Its induction requires translation, but not transcription
- Its expression requires the persistent activation of protein kinase A and protein kinase C
- It declines completely before the onset of long-term memory

== Mechanism ==
=== Induction ===
Because intermediate-term memory does not involve transcription, it likely involves the translation of mRNA transcripts already present in neurons.

== Comparison with short-term/working memory ==
Unlike short-term memory and working memory, intermediate-term memory requires changes in translation to occur in order to function.

== Comparison with long-term memory ==
While ITM requires only changes in translation, induction of long-term memory requires changes in transcription as well. The change from short-term memory to long-term memory is thought to dependent on CREB, which regulates transcription, but because ITM does not involve a change in transcription, it is thought to be independent of CREB activity. According to the definition of ITM proposed by Sutton et al. in 2001, it disappears completely before long-term memory is induced.
