= Verbal memory =

Form of memory

Verbal memory, in cognitive psychology, is memory of words and other abstractions involving language. A variety of tests is used to gauge verbal memory, including learning lists or pairs of words, or recalling a story after it has been told. Verbal memory deals with memory of spoken information.

== Verbal encoding ==
Verbal encoding is the interpretation of verbal stimuli and appears to be strongly left-lateralized in the medial temporal lobe of the human brain; however, its functional neuroanatomy can vary between individuals.

== Verbal recall ==
Verbal recall is the recollection of verbal information. Although left-lateralization is typically associated with language, studies suggest that symmetrical bi-lateralization of language in the brain is advantageous to verbal recall.

== Mechanism ==
Verbal memory and verbal working memory are thought to depend on reverberating neural activity that maintains word representations in the absence of external input. This reverberation is facilitated by dense cortico-cortical connections in the perisylvian region, particularly the arcuate fasciculus, which is more developed in humans than in non-human primates. Brain-constrained neural network models suggest that such connectivity supports sustained activity patterns and thereby enables robust verbal working memory, a prerequisite for human vocabulary building.

== See also ==
- Semantic memory
- Declarative memory
- Sensory memory
- Visual memory
- Spatial memory
