= Short-term memory =

Memory used for information that only needs to be stored for a short time

Short-term memory (or "primary" or "active memory") is the capacity for holding a small amount of information in an active, readily available state for a short interval. For example, short-term memory holds a phone number that has just been recited. The duration of short-term memory (absent rehearsal or active maintenance) is estimated to be on the order of seconds. The commonly cited capacity of 7 items, found in Miller's law, has been superseded by 3-5 items. In contrast, long-term memory holds information indefinitely.

Short-term memory is not the same as working memory, which refers to structures and processes used for temporarily storing and manipulating information.

== Stores ==
The idea of separate memories for short-term and long-term storage originated in the 19th century. A model of memory developed in the 1960s assumed that all memories are formed in one store and transfer to other stores after a small period of time. This model is referred to as the "modal model", most famously detailed by Shiffrin. The model states that memory is first stored in sensory memory, which has a large capacity but can only maintain information for milliseconds. A representation of that rapidly decaying memory is moved to short-term memory. Short-term memory does not have a large capacity like sensory memory, but holds information for seconds or minutes. The final storage is long-term memory, which has a very large capacity and is capable of holding information possibly for a lifetime.

The exact mechanisms by which this transfer takes place, whether all or only some memories are retained permanently, and even to have the existence of a genuine distinction between stores, remain controversial.

=== Evidence ===
==== Anterograde amnesia ====
One form of evidence supporting the existence of a short-term store comes from anterograde amnesia, which is when individuals cannot learn new long-term facts and episodes. Despite these challenges, patients with this form of amnesia have an intact ability to retain small amounts of information over short time scales (up to 30 seconds) but have little ability to form longer-term memories (illustrated by patient HM). This suggests that short-term store is spared from damage and diseases.

==== Distraction tasks ====
Other evidence comes from experimental studies showing that some manipulations such as distractions can impair the recall memory for the last 3 to 5 words most recently learned from a list of words (it is presumed that they are held in short-term memory). However, recall for words from earlier in the list (it is presumed, stored in long-term memory) are unaffected. Other manipulations (e.g., semantic similarity of the words) affect only memory for earlier list words, but do not affect memory for the most recent few words. These results show that different factors such as distraction affect short-term recall (disruption of rehearsal) and long-term recall (semantic similarity). Together, these findings show that long-term memory and short-term memory can vary independently of each other.

=== Models ===
==== Unitary model ====
Not all researchers agree that short- and long-term memory are separate systems. The alternative Unitary Model proposes that short-term memory consists of temporary activations of long term representations (that there is one memory that behaves variously over all time scales, from milliseconds to years). It has been difficult to identify a sharp boundary between short-term and long-term memory. For instance, Tarnow reported that the recall probability vs. latency curve is a straight line from 6 to 600 seconds, with the probability of failure to recall only saturating after 600 seconds. If two different stores were operating in this time domain, it is reasonable to expect a discontinuity in this curve. Other research has shown that the detailed pattern of recall errors looks remarkably similar to recall of a list immediately after learning (it is presumed, from short-term memory) and recall after 24 hours (necessarily from long-term memory).

Further evidence for a unified store comes from experiments involving continual distractor tasks. In 1974, Bjork and Whitten presented subjects with word pairs to remember; before and after each word pair, subjects performed a simple multiplication task for 12 seconds. After the final word-pair, subjects performed the multiplication distractor task for 20 seconds. They reported that the recency effect (the increased probability of recall of the last items studied) and the primacy effect (the increased probability of recall of the first few items) was sustained. These results are incompatible with a separate short-term memory as the distractor items should have displaced some of the word-pairs in the buffer, thereby weakening the associated strength of the items in long-term memory.

Tzeng (1973) reported an instance where the recency effect in free recall did not seem to result from a short-term memory store. Subjects were presented with four study-test periods of 10 word lists, with a continual distractor task (20-second period of counting-backward). At the end of each list, participants had to free-recall as many words as possible. After recall of the fourth list, participants were asked to recall items from all four lists. Both the initial and final recall showed a recency effect. These results violated the predictions of a short-term memory model, where no recency effect would be expected.

Koppenaal and Glanzer (1990) attempted to explain these phenomena as a result of the subjects' adaptation to the distractor task, which allowed them to preserve at least some short-term memory capabilities. In their experiment the long-term recency effect disappeared when the distractor after the last item differed from the distractors that preceded and followed the other items (e.g., arithmetic distractor task and word reading distractor task). Thapar and Greene challenged this theory. In one of their experiments, participants were given a different distractor task after every study item. According to Koppenaal and Glanzer's theory, no recency effect would be expected as subjects would not have had time to adapt to the distractor; yet such a recency effect remained in place in the experiment.

==== Another explanation ====
One proposed explanation for recency in a continual distractor condition, and its disappearance in an end-only distractor task is the influence of contextual and distinctive processes. According to this model, recency is a result of the similarity of the final items' processing context to the processing context of the other items and the distinctive position of the final items versus intermediate items. In the end distractor task, the processing context of the final items is no longer similar to that of the other list items. At the same time, retrieval cues for these items are no longer as effective as without the distractor. Therefore, recency recedes or vanishes. However, when distractor tasks are placed before and after each item, recency returns, because all the list items have similar processing context.

== Synaptic theory ==
Various researchers have proposed that stimuli are coded in short-term memory using transmitter depletion. According to this hypothesis, a stimulus activates a spatial pattern of activity across neurons in a brain region. As these neurons fire, the available neurotransmitters are depleted. This depletion pattern represents stimulus information and functions as a memory trace. The memory trace decays over time as a consequence of neurotransmitter reuptake mechanisms that restore neurotransmitters to prior levels.

== Relationship with working memory ==
The relationship between short-term memory and working memory is described by various theories, but the two concepts are generally considered distinct. Neither holds information for long, but short-term memory is a simple store, while working memory allows it to be manipulated. Short-term memory is part of working memory, but is not the same thing.

Working memory refers to structures and processes used for temporarily storing and manipulating information. Working memory has been termed working attention. Working memory and attention together play a major role in the thought process. Short-term memory in general refers to the short-term storage of information, and it does not encompass memory manipulation or organization. Thus, while short-term memory components appear in working memory models, the concept of short-term memory is distinct from other concepts.

Within Baddeley's influential 1986 model of working memory two short-term storage mechanisms appear: the phonological loop and the visuospatial sketchpad. Most of the above research involves the phonological loop, because most of the work on short-term memory uses verbal material. Since the 1990s, however, research on visual short-term memory and spatial short-term memory has expanded.

== Duration ==
The limited duration of short-term memory (~18 seconds without rehearsal) suggests that its contents spontaneously decay over time. The decay assumption is part of many theories of short-term memory. The most notable one is Baddeley's model of working memory. The decay assumption is usually paired with the idea of rapid covert rehearsal: to retain information for longer, information must be periodically repeated or rehearsed, either by articulating it out loud or by mental simulation. Another type of rehearsal that can improve short-term memory is attention-based rehearsal. Information is mentally searched in a particular sequence. Once recalled, the information re-enters short-term memory and is then retained for a further period.

Nairn and Lewandosky et al. dispute that spontaneous decay plays any significant role in short-term forgetting, and the evidence is not conclusive.

One alternative asserts that several elements (such as digits, words, or pictures, or logos) are held in short-term memory simultaneously, their representations compete with each other for recall, degrading each other. Thereby, new content gradually replaces older content, unless the older content is actively protected.

== Capacity ==
Whatever the cause(s) of short-term forgetting, consensus asserts that it limits the amount of retained new information short term. This limit is referred to as the finite capacity of short-term memory. Short-term memory capacity is often called memory span, in reference to a common measurement procedure. In a memory span test, the experimenter presents a list of items (e.g. digits or words) of increasing length. An individual's span is determined as the longest list length that he or she can recall correctly in the given order on half or more trials.

In an early and influential article, "The Magical Number Seven, Plus or Minus Two", Miller suggested that human short-term memory has a forward memory span of approximately seven plus or minus two items and that that was well known at the time (apparently originating with Wundt). Later research reported that this "magical number seven" is roughly accurate for college students recalling lists of digits, but memory span varies widely across populations and material. For example, the ability to recall words in order depends on characteristics of those words: fewer words can be recalled when the words have longer spoken duration; this is known as the word-length effect, or when their speech sounds are similar to each other; this is called the phonological similarity effect. More words can be recalled when the words are highly familiar or occur frequently in speech. Recall performance is better when all of the words are taken from a single semantic category (such as games) than when the words are chosen randomly. A later estimate of short-term memory capacity reported that the capacity was about four pieces, or "chunks", of information. Other notable theories argue against measuring capacity in terms of the number of elements.

In the visual domain, several studies report no fixed capacity limit in terms of total number of items that can be retained. Instead, some investigators have argued for a limited resource that can be flexibly shared between items held in short-term memory, with some items (in the focus of attention) being allocated more resource and being recalled with greater fidelity. Many of these experiments have used delayed response tasks that have a continuous, analogue response space, rather than using a binary (correct/incorrect) recall method as is often used in change detection tasks. Instead of asking people to report whether a change occurred between the memory and probe array, delayed reproduction tasks require participants to reproduce the precise quality of a visual feature, e.g. an object's orientation or colour.

=== As a Measure of Intelligence ===
According to a model by the physicist Helmar Frank, short-term memory capacity is the actual physical measure of individual differences in intelligence. The capacity C of the "working memory" of human short term memory (measured in bits) is the product of the information processing speed S (in bits per second) and the memory span D in seconds:

C [bits] = S [bits/s] ⋅ D [s]

While the intelligence quotient (IQ) is a relative measure based on the median of a particular population, short-term memory capacity has the advantage of being an absolute measure. Helmar Frank, who published his first book on this topic in 1962, was tasked in his dissertation with exploring how much information a person can actually absorb and mentally process during a complex artistic performance, such as a stage set, and how much simply passes by. Frank conceived the idea of understanding the processing capacity of the human mind, as well as its capacity to learn, as a channel capacity, analogous to Claude Shannon's theory. This led him to define short-term memory capacity.

Building on this theoretical foundation, the psychologist Siegfried Lehrl developed the Short Test of General Intelligence, later renamed the Short Test for General Basic Quantities of Information Processing (KAI), which measures information processing speed as reading speed.

In standardized tests, individuals with an IQ of 130 have a short-term memory capacity of 140 bits, those with an IQ of 112 have 105 bits, and those with an IQ of 94 have 70 bits. Such data reveal that, unlike IQ, short-term memory capacity is not normalized to a Gaussian distribution. Instead, it exhibits a log-normal distribution.

=== Rehearsal ===
Rehearsal is the process of repeating information to be retained, ostensibly keeping it in short-term memory. Each repetition reenters the information into short-term memory, thus keeping that information for another 10 to 20 seconds (the average storage time for short-term memory). This process allows information to be stored in the memory avoiding distracting stimuli, rehearsal allows new information to be strengthened which results in a likelihood of this information being stored in the long-term memory However, the success of rehearsal can depend on factors such as attention as well as any form of distraction that is present because of this active rehearsal is essential to store that new information.

=== Chunking ===
Chunking is a technique that allows memory to remember more things. Chunking involves organizing material into meaningful groups. Chunking can greatly increase recall capacity. For example, in recalling a phone number, chunking the digits into three groups (area code, prefix, and extension). This method of remembering phone numbers is far more effective than attempting to remember a sequence of 10 digits.

Practice and the usage of existing information in long-term memory can lead to additional improvements in chunking. In one testing session, an American cross-country runner was able to recall a string of 79 digits after hearing them only once by chunking them into groups the size of a running time.

=== Factors ===
Diseases that cause neurodegeneration, such as Alzheimer's disease, can damage short-term as well as long-term memory. Damage to certain sections of the brain due to this disease causes a shrinkage in the cerebral cortex, which impairs the ability to think and recall.

Short-term memory performance is influenced by diet. More intake of blueberries was reported to improve short-term memory after continuous use whereas alcohol decreases short-term memory performance.

== Conditions ==
=== Age ===
Memory loss is a natural aging process. Research has reported short-term memory decreases with age. The decline appears to be constant and continuous beginning in the twenties.

One study used data from a previous study that compiled normative French data for three short-term memory tasks (verbal, visual and spatial). They found impairments in participants between the ages of 55 and 85 years of age.

Advanced age is also associated with decrements in episodic memory. The associated deficit is that differences in recognition memory reflect difficulty in binding components of a memory episode and bound units. A previous study used mixed and blocked test designs and reported an associative deficit for older adults.

Even absent neurological diseases and disorders, progressive and gradual loss of some intellectual functions become evident in later years. Several tests assess the psychophysical characteristics of the elderly, such as the functional reach (FR) test and the mini–mental state examination (MMSE). FR is an index of the aptitude to maintain balance in an upright position, while the MMSE test is a global index of cognitive abilities. These tests were used by Costarella et al. to evaluate the psychophysical characteristics of older adults. They found a loss of physical performance (FR, related to height) as well as a loss of cognitive abilities (MMSE).

=== Alzheimer's disease ===
Memory distortion in Alzheimer's disease is a disorder common in older adults. One study compared patients with mild to moderate Alzheimer's disease versus age matched healthy adults. Alzheimer's patients had more severely reduced short-term memory. Visual short-term memory is also impaired in sporadic, late-onset as well as familial Alzheimer's disease, when assessed using delayed reproduction tasks. These studies point to a deficit in visual feature binding as an important component of the deficit. Episodic memory and semantic abilities deteriorate early in Alzheimer's disease. Since the cognitive system includes interconnected and reciprocally influenced neuronal networks, one study hypothesized that stimulation of lexical-semantic abilities may benefit semantically structured episodic memory. They found that Lexical-Semantic stimulation treatment could improve episodic memory.

=== Aphasia ===
Aphasias commonly occur after left-hemisphere stroke or with neurodegenerative conditions such as primary progressive aphasias. Patients with left temporoparietal focal lesions may suffer a deficit of verbal short-term memory, which may also be a feature of logopenic primary progressive aphasia.

Many language-impaired patients complain about short-term memory deficits. Family members confirm that patients have trouble recalling previously known names and events. These signals are supported by studies reporting that many aphasics also have trouble with visual-memory required tasks. There have been reports of deficits in verbal short-term memory when related to short-term memory, these deficits are harder to treat since there are less measurements for verbal short-term memory.

=== Schizophrenia ===
Core symptoms of schizophrenia patients have been linked to cognitive deficits. One neglected factor that contributes to those deficits is the comprehension of time. Schizophrenics are not able to process how much time has passed. They are unable to process this because they have impaired temporal information processing. They cannot tell what the actual time is, what day of the week it is, what month it is, or what year it is. For some, they feel as though time is either sped up or slowed down. This causes them to have instability in life. Not being able to tell time or know what year they are in, forces them to not be able to have a stable life. Schizophrenics have the inability to detect rhythm irregularities and estimating durations of time. This affects the verbal and psychical abilities. They have a harder time making judgments between multiple events because it is all bound together as one for them.

=== Post-traumatic stress disorder ===
Posttraumatic stress disorder (PTSD) is associated with altered processing of emotional material with strong attentional bias toward trauma-related information. It interferes with cognitive processing. Aside from trauma processing specificities, a range of cognitive impairments have been associated with PTSD state, including attention and verbal memory deficits.

==== Intelligence ====
Few studies have been done on the relationship between short-term memory and intelligence. One study examined whether people with PTSD had equivalent levels of short-term, non-verbal memory on the Benton Visual Retention Test (BVRT), and whether they had equivalent levels of intelligence on the Raven Standard Progressive Matrices (RSPM). They found that people with PTSD had worse short-term, non-verbal memory on the BVRT, despite having comparable levels of intelligence on the RSPM, concluding impairments in memory influence intelligence assessments in the subjects.

== Short-term memory in literature and popular culture ==
- "The Last Hippie" in An Anthropologist on Mars, a medical case history in a book by British neurologist Oliver Sacks.
- 50 First Dates, a film
- Ghajini, a film
- Memento, a film
- "Ænema", Tool

== See also ==
- Clive Wearing
- Contrast long-term memory and intermediate-term memory
- Iconic memory
- Prefrontal cortex § Attention and memory
- Random-access memory, the analogy in computers
