= Sensory memory =

Impressions of sensory information

During every moment of an organism's life, sensory information is being taken in by sensory receptors and processed by the nervous system. Sensory information is stored in sensory memory just long enough to be transferred to short-term memory. Humans have five traditional senses: sight, hearing, taste, smell, touch. Sensory memory (SM) allows individuals to retain impressions of sensory information after the original stimulus has ceased. A common demonstration of SM is a child's ability to write letters and make circles by twirling a sparkler at night. When the sparkler is spun fast enough, it appears to leave a trail which forms a continuous image. This "light trail" is the image that is represented in the visual sensory store known as iconic memory. The other two types of SM that have been most extensively studied are echoic memory, and haptic memory; however, it is reasonable to assume that each physiological sense has a corresponding memory store. For example, children have been shown to remember specific "sweet" tastes during incidental learning trials but the nature of this gustatory store is still unclear. However, sensory memories might be related to a region of the thalamus, which serves as a source of signals encoding past experiences in the neocortex.

== Characteristics ==
SM is considered to be outside of cognitive control and is instead an automatic response. The information represented in SM is the "raw data" which provides a snapshot of a person's overall sensory experience. Common features between each sensory modality have been identified. However, as experimental techniques advance, exceptions and additions to these general characteristics will surely evolve. The auditory store, echoic memory, for example, has been shown to have a temporal characteristic in which the timing and tempo of a presented stimulus affects transfer into more stable forms of memory. Four common features have been identified for all forms of SM:

1. The formation of a SM trace is only weakly dependent on attention to the stimulus.
2. The information stored in SM is modality specific. This means, for example, that echoic memory is for the exclusive storage of auditory information, and haptic memory is for the exclusive storage of tactile information.
3. Each SM store represents an immense amount of detail resulting in very high resolution of information.
4. Each SM store is very brief and lasts a very short period of time. Once the SM trace has decayed or is replaced by a new memory, the information stored is no longer accessible and is ultimately lost. All SM stores have slightly different durations which is discussed in more detail on their respective pages.

It is widely accepted that all forms of SM are very brief in duration; however, the approximated duration of each memory store is not static. Iconic memory, for example, holds visual information for approximately 250 milliseconds. The SM is made up of spatial or categorical stores of different kinds of information, each subject to different rates of information processing and decay. The visual sensory store has a relatively high capacity, with the ability to hold up to 12 items. Genetics also play a role in SM capacity; mutations to the brain-derived neurotrophic factor (BDNF), a nerve growth factor, and N-methyl-D-aspartate (NMDA) receptors, responsible for synaptic plasticity, decrease iconic and echoic memory capacities respectively.

== Types ==
=== Iconic memory ===
The mental representation of the visual stimuli are referred to as icons (fleeting images.) Iconic memory was the first sensory store to be investigated with experiments dating back as far as 1740. One of the earliest investigations into this phenomenon was by Ján Andrej Segner, a German physicist and mathematician. In his experiment, Segner attached a glowing coal to a cart wheel and rotated the wheel at increasing speed until an unbroken circle of light was perceived by the observer. He calculated that the glowing coal needed to make a complete circle in under 100ms to achieve this effect, which he determined was the duration of this visual memory store. In 1960, George Sperling conducted a study where participants were shown a set of letters for a brief amount of time and were asked to recall the letters they were shown afterwards. Participants were less likely to recall more letters when asked about the whole group of letters, but recalled more when asked about specific subgroups of the whole. These findings suggest that iconic memory in humans has a large capacity, but decays very rapidly. Another study set out to test the idea that visual sensory memory consists of coarse-grained and fine-grained memory traces using a mathematical model to quantify each. The study suggested that the dual-trace model of visual memory out-performed single-trace models.

=== Echoic memory ===
Echoic memory represents SM for the auditory sense of hearing. Auditory information travels as sound waves which are sensed by hair cells in the ears. Information is sent to and processed in the temporal lobe. The echoic sensory store holds information for 2–3 seconds to allow for proper processing. The first studies of echoic memory came shortly after Sperling investigated iconic memory using an adapted partial report paradigm. Today, characteristics of echoic memory have been found mainly using a mismatch negativity (MMN) paradigm which utilizes EEG and MEG recordings. MMN has been used to identify some of the key roles of echoic memory such as change detection and language acquisition. Change detection, or the ability to detect an unusual or possibly dangerous change in the environment independent of attention, is key to the survival of an organism. One study focusing on echoic sensory changes suggested that when a sound is presented to a subject, it is enough to shape an echoic memory trace that can be compared to a physically different sound. Change-related cortical responses were detected in the superior temporal gyrus using EEG. With regards to language, a characteristic of children who begin speaking late in development is reduced duration of echoic memory. In short, "Echoic memory is a fast-decaying store of auditory information." In the case of damage to or lesions developing on the frontal lobe, parietal lobe, or hippocampus, echoic memory will likely be shortened and/or have a slower reaction time.

=== Haptic memory ===
Haptic memory represents SM for the tactile sense of touch. Sensory receptors all over the body detect sensations such as pressure, itching, and pain. Information from receptors travel through afferent neurons in the spinal cord to the postcentral gyrus of the parietal lobe in the brain. This pathway comprises the somatosensory system. Evidence for haptic memory has only recently been identified resulting in a small body of research regarding its role, capacity, and duration. Already however, fMRI studies have revealed that specific neurons in the prefrontal cortex are involved in both SM, and motor preparation which provides a crucial link to haptic memory and its role in motor responses.

=== Proprioceptive memory ===
Patients undergoing regional anesthesia can have incorrect, "phantom" perception of their limb positions during a procedure. A longstanding neurological explanation of this effect was that, without incoming signals from proprioceptive neurons, the limb perception system presented to consciousness a default, slightly flexed position, considered to be a universal, inborn "body schema". However, more deliberate experimentation, varying patient limb position prior to anesthesia, has established that there is a proprioceptive memory store, which informs these perceptions. More task-oriented experimentation with limb position—asking subjects to return their arm to a remembered position—has revealed a rapidly decaying, high-precision memory available for two to four seconds, which is theorized to be the proprioceptive equivalent of iconic memory and echoic memory.

A somewhat different theory of proprioceptive memory has been put forward as an explanation of phantom limb phenomena. The hypothesis states that we remember limb positions which are used in common tasks, such driving, riding a bike, eating with a fork, etc. The formation of a "proprioceptive memory bank" over the course of our lives contributes to our proficiency with these tasks, and the ease with which they are performed. Memories of specific limb positions can also be associated with expected sensations, including pain. In the theory as described by Anderson-Barnes et al., these memories aid us to rapidly ascribe location and cause when pain does occur, especially pain caused by an overextended joint; and these memories also help us rapidly choose a motion which will relieve the pain. However, in the case of amputation, the remembered pain is being continually or intermittently ascribed to the perceived limb position, often because the most recent limb position prior to amputation was in fact painful. This pain, and the role of proprioceptive memory in perpetuating it, has been compared to tinnitus and the role of echoic memory in its etiology.

== Relationship with other memory systems ==
SM is not involved in higher cognitive functions such as consolidation of memory traces or comparison of information. Likewise, the capacity and duration of SM cannot be influenced by top-down control; a person cannot consciously think or choose what information is stored in SM, or how long it will be stored for. The role of SM is to provide a detailed representation of our entire sensory experience for which relevant pieces of information can be extracted by short-term memory (STM) and processed by working memory (WM). STM is capable of storing information for 10–15 seconds without rehearsal while working memory actively processes, manipulates, and controls the information. Information from STM can then be consolidated into long-term memory where memories can last a lifetime. The transfer of SM to STM is the first step in the Atkinson–Shiffrin memory model which proposes a structure of memory.

== See also ==
- Intermediate-term memory
- Memory
- Visual memory
