= Echoic memory =

Sensory memory register

Echoic memory is a type of sensory memory that briefly stores sounds (auditory information or stimulus), allowing them to be digested and comprehended. Unlike most visual memory, where a person can choose how long to view the stimulus and can reassess it repeatedly, auditory stimuli are usually transient and cannot be reassessed. Since echoic memories are heard once, they are stored for slightly longer periods of time than iconic memories (visual memories). Auditory stimuli are received by the ear one at a time before they can be processed and understood.

Echoic memory has been described as a momentary "holding tank", where a sound is unprocessed (or held back) until the following sound is heard, and only then can it be interpreted in a meaningful way. This sensory store is capable of storing large amounts of auditory information that is only retained for a short period of time, typically 3 to 4 seconds. This echoic sound resonates in the mind and is replayed for this brief amount of time shortly after being heard.

Echoic memory encodes basic features of sound, such as spatial location or pitch. It does not store complex semantic information.

== Overview ==
Shortly after George Sperling's partial report studies of the visual memories and how they are stored, researchers began investigating its auditory counterpart. The term echoic memory was coined in 1967 by Ulric Neisser to describe this brief representation of acoustic information. It was initially studied using an approach similar to that of Sperling's research. But modern neuropsychological techniques have given us the ability to estimate the capacity, duration, and location of echoic memory storage.

Using Sperling's model as an analogue, researchers continue to apply his work to the auditory sensory store using partial and whole report experiments. Studies have found that the echoic memory can store memories for up to 4 seconds. But researchers have proposed differing estimates of the duration of echoic memory storage. However, different durations have been proposed for the existing echo once the hearing signal has been presented. Guttman and Julesz suggested that it may last approximately one second or less, while Eriksen and Johnson suggested that it can take up to 10 seconds.

=== Early work ===
Baddeley's model of working memory consists of the visuospatial sketchpad which is related to iconic memory, and a phonological loop which attends to auditory information processing in two ways. The phonological storage is broken up into two sections. The first is the storage of words that we hear; this tends to have the capacity to retain information for 3–4 seconds before decay, which is a much longer duration than iconic memory (which is less than 1000ms). The second is a sub-vocal rehearsal process to keep refreshing the memory trace by using one's "inner voice". This consists of the words repeating in a loop in our mind. However, this model does not fully provide a detailed description of the relationship between the initial sensory input and ensuing memory processes.

A short-term memory model proposed by Nelson Cowan attempts to address this problem by describing a verbal sensory memory input and storage in more detail. It suggests a pre-attentive sensory storage system that can hold a large amount of accurate information over a short period of time and consists of an initial phase input of 200-400ms and a secondary phase that transfers the information into a more long-term memory store to be integrated into working memory which starts to decay after 10-20s.

== Testing methods ==
=== Partial and whole report ===
Echoic memory is measured by behavioural tasks where participants are asked to repeat a sequence of tones, words, or syllables that were presented to them, usually requiring attention and motivation. The most famous partial report task was conducted by presenting participants with an auditory stimulus in the left, right, and both ears simultaneously. Then they were asked to report the spatial location and category name of each stimulus. Results showed that spatial location was recalled more easily than semantic information when inhibiting information from one ear over the other. Consistent with results on iconic memory tasks, performance on the partial report conditions were far superior to the whole report condition. In addition, a decrease in performance was observed as the interstimulus interval (length of time between presentation of the stimulus and recall) increased.

=== Auditory backward recognition masking ===
Auditory backward recognition masking is one of the most successful tasks in studying audition. It involves presenting participants with a brief target stimulus, followed by a second stimulus (the mask) after an interstimulus interval. The amount of time the auditory information is available in memory is manipulated by the length of the interstimulus interval. Performance as indicated by accuracy of target information increases as the interstimulus interval increases to 250 ms. The mask doesn't affect the amount of information obtained from the stimulus, but it acts as interference for further processing.

=== Mismatch negativity ===
A more objective, independent task capable of measuring auditory sensory memory that does not require focused attention are mismatch negativity tasks, which record changes in activation in the brain by use of electroencephalography. This records elements of auditory event-related potentials of brain activity elicited 150-200ms after a stimulus. This stimulus is an unattended, infrequent, "oddball" or deviant stimulus presented among a sequence of standard stimuli, thereby comparing the deviant stimulus to a memory trace.

== Neurological basis ==
Auditory sensory memory has been found to be stored in the primary auditory cortex contralateral to the ear of presentation. This echoic memory storage involves several different brain areas, due to the different processes it is involved in. The majority of brain regions involved are located in the prefrontal cortex as this is where the executive control is located, and is responsible for attentional control. The phonological store and the rehearsal system appear to be a left-hemisphere-based memory system as increased brain activity has been observed in these areas. The major regions involved are the left posterior ventrolateral prefrontal cortex, the left premotor cortex, and the left posterior parietal cortex. Within the ventrolateral prefrontal cortex, Broca's area is the main location responsible for verbal rehearsal and the articulatory process. The dorsal premotor cortex is used in rhythmic organization and rehearsal, and finally the posterior parietal cortex is suggested to play a role in localizing objects in space.

The cortical areas in the brain believed to be involved with auditory sensory memory exhibited by mismatch negativity response have not been localized specifically. However results have shown comparative activation in the superior temporal gyrus and in the inferior temporal gyrus.

== Development ==
Age-related increases in activation within the neural structures responsible for echoic memory have been observed showing that with age comes increased proficiency in the processing of auditory sensory information.

Findings of a mismatch negativity study also suggest that the duration of auditory sensory memory increases with age, significantly between the ages of two and six years old from 500-5000ms. Children 2 years of age exhibited a mismatch negativity response in the interstimulus interval between 500 ms and 1000 ms. Children 3 years old have a mismatch negativity response from 1 to 2 seconds, 4-year-olds over 2 seconds, and 6-year-old children from 3 to 5 seconds. These developmental and cognitive changes occur at a young age, and extend into adulthood until eventually decreasing again at old age.

Researchers have found shortened echoic memory duration in former late talkers, children with precordial catch syndrome, and oral clefts, with information decaying before 2000 ms. However this reduced echoic memory is not predictive for language difficulties in adulthood.

One study found that when words were presented to both younger subjects and adult subjects, the younger subjects outperformed the adult subjects as the rate at which the words were presented was increased

Affect echoic memory capacity may be independent of age.

== Problems ==
Children with deficits in auditory memory have been shown to have developmental language disorders. These problems are difficult to assess since performance could be due to their inability to understand a given task, rather than a problem with their memory.

People with attributed unilateral damage to the dorsolateral prefrontal cortex and temporal-parietal cortex after experiencing a stroke were measured using the mismatch negativity test. For the control group the mismatch negativity amplitude was largest in the right hemisphere regardless of whether the tone was presented in the right or left ear.

Mismatch negativity was greatly reduced for temporal-parietal damaged patients when the auditory stimulus was presented to the contralateral ear of the lesion side of the brain. This adheres to the theory of auditory sensory memory being stored in the contralateral auditory cortex of ear presentation. Further research on stroke victims with a reduced auditory memory store has shown that listening to daily music or audio books improved their echoic memory. This suggested a positive effect of music in neural rehabilitation after brain damage.

== See also ==
- Music-related memory
- Sensory memory
- Iconic memory
- Haptic memory
