= Annie Lang =

Psychophysiology researcher

Annie Lang is an American communication scholar and psychophysiologist best known for the Limited Capacity Model of Motivated Mediated Message Processing (LC4MP), a data-driven theory of cognitive processing in media communication.

Lang served on the faculty of Washington State University as an assistant professor from 1987 to 1995 and joined Indiana University in 1995, where she directed the Institute for Communication Research until 2004 and later held the title of Distinguished Professor before retiring in 2021.

== Education ==
Lang earned a Bachelor of Science in mass communication from the University of Wisconsin–Madison and a Master of Arts in mass communication from the University of Florida. She completed a Ph.D. in mass communication at the University of Wisconsin–Madison in 1987 with a dissertation titled "The effects of the formal features of television on viewers' attention and arousal: Cardiac response, attention, and arousal."

== Career ==
Lang joined Washington State University as an assistant professor after completing her PhD in 1987.

She moved to Indiana University in 1995 to the then Department of Telecommunications, where she served as director of the Institute for Communication Research for nine years and later as associate dean for research in the College of Arts and Sciences. At Indiana University she held the title of Distinguished Professor of Communication Science and Cognitive Science prior to her retirement in 2021.

Lang also served on the founding editorial board of the peer-reviewed Journal of Media Psychology.

== Theories ==
Annie Lang's work centres on theories of cognitive processing in media communication. She introduced the Limited Capacity Model of Motivated Mediated Message Processing (LC4MP), which treats communication as an interaction between messages and human information processors with finite cognitive resources. She later developed the Dynamic Human-Centered Communication Systems Theory (DHCCST), framing communication as a complex adaptive system in which embodied individuals interact continuously over time with media and environments.

Lang's publications include critiques and refinements of these models, culminating in a chapter on the evolution from LC4MP to DHCCST in the ICA Handbook series.

== Awards ==
- Kreighbaum Under 40 Award from the Association for Education in Journalism and Mass Communication in 1997
- Fellow of the International Communication Association 2007
- University of Florida School of Journalism and Mass Communication distinguished alumna 2007
- International Communication Association Career Achievement Award in 2009
