= Sharon Lamb =

American education psychologist

- Born: September 11, 1955 (age 70)
- Education: Harvard Graduate School of Education
- Known for: Professor of counseling and school psychology
- Spouse: Paul Orgel
- Children: 2 sons
- Awards: Society for Sex Therapy and Research (SSTAR) Health Professional Book Award
- Scientific career
- Fields: Psychology
- Workplaces: University of Massachusetts Boston, College of Education and Human Development

Sharon Lamb (born September 11, 1955) is an American professor in the Department of Counseling and School Psychology at the University of Massachusetts Boston's, College of Education and Human Development, and a fellow of the American Psychological Association (APA). She also sits on the editorial board of the academic journals Feminism & Psychology, and Sexualization, Media, and Society.

Lamb is one of the authors of the APA's report into the sexualization of girls, which according to an article on Women and Hollywood is "the most downloaded document in the history of the APA’s website". She is also a co-author for the APA's Guidelines for Psychological Practice with Girls and Women.

Sharon Lamb also practices psychology in Shelburne Vermont where she performs evaluations for the courts, attachment evaluations and custody evaluations, and sees private therapy clients.

== Education ==
Lamb gained both her EdD in Human Development, and her EdM in Counseling and Consulting Psychology from Harvard Graduate School of Education. She also obtained her PhD at the Free University (Vrije Universiteit) in Amsterdam, the Netherlands, under the supervision of philosophers Doret de Ruyter and Jan Steutel.

== Personal life ==
She is married to the pianist Paul Orgel and has/had two sons. Her younger son died on July 6, 2018, at the age of 26. Her older son lives with his family in Austin, Texas.

== Grants and awards ==
- 2006 Books for a Better Life Award (Childcare/Parenting) for "Packaging Girlhood"
- 2007 "Gift of Time" Mid-Career Sabbatical Award from the Association for Moral Education to create a Sexual Ethics Curriculum,
- 2008 Society for Sex Therapy and Research (SSTAR) Health Professional Book Award for "Sex, Therapy, and Kids"
- 2013 The Spencer Foundation, New Civics Initiative Grants for research into Sex Education as Ethics Education in the New Civics

== Bibliography ==
=== Books ===
- Lamb, Sharon (1988). The emergence of moral concern in the second year of life (Ph.D. thesis). Harvard University. OCLC 20552754.
- Lamb, Sharon; Kagan, Jerome (1990). The emergence of morality in young children. Chicago: University of Chicago Press. ISBN 9780226422329.
- Lamb, Sharon (1999). The trouble with blame: victims, perpetrators, and responsibility. Cambridge, Massachusetts London: St. Martin's Press. ISBN 9781429906326.
- Lamb, Sharon (1999). New versions of victims: feminists struggle with the concept. New York: New York University Press. ISBN 9780814751534.
- Lamb, Sharon (2001). The secret lives of girls: what good girls really do - sex play, aggression, and their guilt. New York: Free Press. ISBN 9780743201070.
- Lamb, Sharon; Murphy, Jeffrie G. (2002). Before forgiving: cautionary views of forgiveness in psychotherapy. Oxford New York: Oxford University Press. ISBN 9780195145205.
- Lamb, Sharon (2006). Sex, therapy, and kids: addressing their concerns through talk and play. New York: W.W. Norton & Co. ISBN 9780393704792.
- Lamb, Sharon; Brown, Lyn Mikel (2007). Packaging girlhood: rescuing our daughters from marketers' schemes. New York: St. Martin's Griffin. ISBN 9780312370053.
- Lamb, Sharon; Brown, Lyn Mikel; Tappan, Mark (2009). Packaging boyhood: saving our sons from superheroes, slackers, and other media stereotypes. New York: St. Martin's Griffin. ISBN 9781429983259.
- Lamb, Sharon (2013). Sex ed for caring schools: creating an ethics-based curriculum. New York: Teachers College Press. ISBN 9780807753989.
- Lamb, Sharon (2016). Girls of color, sexuality, and sex education, Palgrave/Macmillan.
- Lamb, S. & Gilbert, J. Editors. (2019). Cambridge handbook of sexual development: Children and adolescents. Cambridge, UK: Cambridge University Press.
- Lamb, S. (June 5, 2019). The not good enough mother, Boston: Beacon Press.

=== Chapters in books ===
- Lamb, Sharon (2006), "Forgiveness therapy in gendered contexts: What happens to the truth?", in Potter, Nancy N. (ed.), Trauma, truth and reconciliation: healing damaged relationships, Oxford New York: Oxford University Press, pp. 229–256, ISBN 9780198569435
- Lamb, Sharon; Plocha, Aleksandra (2011), "The underlying ethics in sex education: What are the needs of vulnerable groups?", in de Ruyter, Doret J.; Miedema, Siebren (eds.), Moral education and development: a lifetime commitment, Rotterdam, Netherlands: Sense Publishers, pp. 163–177, ISBN 9789460917141
- Lamb, Sharon (2011), "The place of mutuality and care in democratic sexuality education: incorporating the other person", in Carlson, Dennis; Roseboro, Donyell L. (eds.), The sexuality curriculum and youth culture, New York: Peter Lang, pp. 29–43, ISBN 9781433110009
- Lamb, Sharon (2011), "Sexual tensions in girls' friendships", in Kimmel, Michael; Aronson, Amy (eds.), The gendered society reader (4th ed.), New York: Oxford University Press, pp. 554–558, ISBN 9780199733712
- Lamb, Sharon; Vozzola, Elizabeth C. (2012), "Moral development", in Meyer, Luanna H. (ed.), Oxford bibliographies, New York: Oxford University Press, ISBN 9780199756810 Available online as: Lamb, Sharon; Vozzola, Elizabeth C. (December 2011). "Moral development". Oxford Bibliographies Online. doi:10.1093/OBO/9780199756810-0056.
- Lamb, Sharon (2013), "Healthy sexuality in adolescent girls", in Zurbriggen, Eileen L.; Roberts, Tomi-Ann (eds.), The sexualization of girls and girlhood: causes, consequences, and resistance, New York: Oxford University Press, pp. 278–301, ISBN 9780199731657
- Lamb, Sharon (2014), "The hard work of pleasure", in Allen, Louisa; Rasmussen, Mary Lou; Quinlivan, Kathleen (eds.), The politics of pleasure in sexuality education: pleasure bound, New York: Routledge, pp. 136–152, ISBN 9780415812269
- Lamb, Sharon; Plocha, Aleksandra (2014), "Sexuality in childhood", in Tolman, Deborah L.; Diamond, Lisa M. (eds.), APA handbook of sexuality and psychology (person-based approaches), vol. 1, Washington, D.C.: American Psychological Association, pp. 415–432, ISBN 9781433813696 Also available as Lamb, Sharon; Plocha, Aleksandra (2014). "Sexuality in childhood". APA handbook of sexuality and psychology, Vol. 1: Person-based approaches. American Psychological Association. pp. 415–432. doi:10.1037/14193-014. ISBN 978-1-4338-1371-9.
- Lamb, S. & Randazzo, R. (2016) Obstacles to teaching ethics in sexuality education. In J. Ponzetti (Ed.) Evidence-based approaches to sex education: A global perspective 113–129). NY: Routledge.
- Lamb, S. & Brodt (2017). Psychotherapy with girls: The problems of real girls and the distractions of diagnosis. In APA Handbook of the Psychology of Women.
- Lamb, S., White, L., & Plocha, A. (in press). Childhood sexuality. In S. Lamb & J. Gilbert (in press). Cambridge handbook of sexual development: Children and adolescents.
- Jarkovska, L., & Lamb, S. (in press). Not innocent but vulnerable: An approach to childhood sexuality. In S. Lamb & J. Gilbert (in press). Cambridge handbook of sexual development: Children and adolescents.

=== Journal articles ===
- Lamb, Sharon (January 2006). "Forgiveness, women, and responsibility to the group". Journal of Human Rights. 5 (1): 45–60. doi:10.1080/14754830500485874. S2CID 144580128.
- Lamb, Sharon (September 2007). "Have girls gone wild? Teenage girls, sex, and therapy" (PDF). Counseling Children and Young People. Counseling Children and Young People (CCYP): 18–22. Archived from the original (PDF) on May 17, 2008.
- Lamb, Sharon; Zurbriggen, Eileen L.; Collins, Rebecca L.; Roberts, Tomi-Ann; Tolman, Deborah L.; Ward, L. Monique (2007). "Report of the American Psychological Association Task Force on the Sexualization of Girls". American Psychological Association (APA).
- Lamb, Sharon; Machia, Marty (February 2009). "Sexualized innocence: effects of magazine ads portraying adult women as sexy little girls". Journal of Media Psychology: Theories, Methods, and Applications. 21 (1): 15–24. doi:10.1027/1864-1105.21.1.15.
- Lamb, Sharon (March 2009). "Commentary and criticism: girls, boys, and "girlhood" studies (Thinking outside the box: a call for new theory to underscore the need for boyhood studies?)". Feminist Media Studies. 9 (1): 115–118. doi:10.1080/14680770802619540. S2CID 216643727.
- Lamb, Sharon (March 2010). "Porn as a pathway to empowerment? a response to Peterson's commentary". Sex Roles. 62 (5–6): 314–317. doi:10.1007/s11199-010-9756-8. S2CID 144501261.
- Lamb, Sharon (March 2010). "Feminist ideals for a healthy female adolescent sexuality: a critique". Sex Roles. 62 (5–6): 294–306. doi:10.1007/s11199-009-9698-1. S2CID 144574891.
- Lamb, Sharon (Spring 2010). "Toward a sexual ethics curriculum: bringing philosophy and society to bear on individual development". Harvard Educational Review. 80 (1): 81–106. doi:10.17763/haer.80.1.c104834k00552457.
- Lamb, Sharon; Graling, Kelly; Lustig, Kara (October 2011). "Stereotypes in four current AOUM sexuality education curricula: good girls, good boys, and the new gender equality". American Journal of Sexuality Education. 6 (4): 360–380. doi:10.1080/15546128.2011.624477. S2CID 142895120.
- Lamb, Sharon; Peterson, Zoë D. (June 2012). "Adolescent girls' sexual empowerment: two feminists explore the concept". Sex Roles. 66 (11–12): 703–712. doi:10.1007/s11199-011-9995-3. S2CID 145018029.
- Lamb, Sharon; Peterson, Zoë D. (June 2012). "The political context for personal empowerment: continuing the conversation". Sex Roles. 66 (11–12): 758–763. doi:10.1007/s11199-012-0150-6. S2CID 144130039.
- Lamb, Sharon; Lustig, Kara; Graling, Kelly (May 2013). "The use and misuse of pleasure in sex education curricula". Sex Education: Sexuality, Society and Learning. 13 (3): 305–318. doi:10.1080/14681811.2012.738604. S2CID 145512187.
- Lamb, Sharon; Graling, Kelly; Wheeler, Emily E. (May 2013). "'Pole-arized' discourse: an analysis of responses to Miley Cyrus's Teen Choice Awards pole dance". Feminism & Psychology. 23 (2): 163–183. doi:10.1177/0959353512472482. S2CID 145604953.
- Lamb, Sharon (October 2013). "Just the facts? The separation of sex education from moral education". Educational Theory. 63 (5): 443–460. doi:10.1111/edth.12034.
- Lamb, S. & Plocha, A. (2015) Pride, shame, and sexiness: Girls of color discuss race, body image, and sexualization. Girlhood Studies, 8(2), 86–102. DOI: 10.3167/ghs.2015.080207
- Randazzo, R., Farmer, K., & Lamb, S. (2015). Queer women's perspectives on sexualization in media. Journal of Bisexuality, 15(1), 1-31. DOI: 10.1080/15299716.2014.986315
- Lamb, S., Farmer, K., Kosterina, E., Lambe Sarinana, S., Plocha, A., & Randazzo, R. (2015). What's sexy? Adolescent girls discuss confidence, danger, and media influence. Gender & Education, 28(4), 527-545. DOI:10.1080/09540253.2015.1107528
- Lamb, S., & Randazzo, R. (2016). An examination of the effectiveness of a sexual ethics curriculum. Journal of Moral Education. DOI: 10.1080/03057240.2016.1156520
- Lamb, S., & Randazzo, R. (2016.) Sex education as a form of civics education in a neoliberal context. Curriculum Inquiry, 46(2), 148–167. DOI:10.1080/03626784.2016.1144465
- Lamb, S., & Brodt, M. (2017). Sexual ethics curriculum evaluation: A buzzing, blooming, confusion in the classroom. Sage Research Methods Cases Part 2. Thousand Oaks, CA:Sage Press. DOI: 10.4135/9781473970670
- Lamb, S., Kosterina, E., Roberts, T., Brodt, M., Maroney, M. & Dangler, L. (2017). Voices of the mind: Hegemonic masculinity and others in mind during young men's sexual encounters. Men & Masculinities. DOI:10.1177/1097184X17695038
- Gable, S., Lamb, S., Brodt, M., & Attwell, L. (2017). Intervening in a ‘sketchy situation’: Exploring the moral motivations of college bystanders of sexual assault. Journal of Interpersonal Violence. DOI: 10.1177/0886260517730027
