= Syntactic ambiguity =

Sentences with structures permitting multiple possible interpretations

Syntactic ambiguity, also known as structural ambiguity, amphiboly, or amphibology, is characterized by the potential for a sentence to yield multiple interpretations due to its ambiguous syntax. This form of ambiguity is not derived from the varied meanings of individual words but rather from the relationships among words and clauses within a sentence, concealing interpretations beneath the word order. Consequently, a sentence presents as syntactically ambiguous when it permits reasonable derivation of several possible grammatical structures by an observer.

In jurisprudence, the interpretation of syntactically ambiguous phrases in statutory texts or contracts may be done by courts. Occasionally, claims based on highly improbable interpretations of such ambiguities are dismissed as being frivolous litigation and without merit. The term parse forest refers to the collection of all possible syntactic structures, known as parse trees, that can represent the ambiguous sentence's meanings. The task of clarifying which meaning is actually intended from among the possibilities is known as syntactic disambiguation.

== Different forms ==
=== Globally ambiguous ===
A globally ambiguous sentence is one that has at least two distinct interpretations and where reading the entire sentence does not resolve the ambiguity. Globally ambiguous sentences exist where no feature of the representation (e.g., word order and/or grammatical inflection) distinguishes the possible distinct interpretations. Global ambiguities are often unnoticed because readers tend to choose the interpretation they understand to be more probable. One example of a global ambiguity is "The woman held the baby in the green blanket." In this example, the baby, incidentally wrapped in the green blanket, is being held by the woman, or the woman is using the green blanket as an instrument to hold the baby, or the woman is wrapped in the green blanket and holding the baby.

=== Locally ambiguous ===
A locally ambiguous sentence is a sentence that contains an ambiguous phrase but has only one interpretation. The ambiguity in a locally ambiguous sentence briefly stays and is resolved, i.e., disambiguated, by the end of the sentence. Sometimes, local ambiguities can result in garden-path sentences, in which a structurally correct sentence is difficult to interpret because one interpretation of the ambiguous region is not the one that makes most sense.

== Examples ==
"The duke yet lives that Henry shall depose." — Henry VI (1.4.30), by William Shakespeare
- Henry will depose the duke.
- The duke will depose Henry.

Amphiboly occurs frequently in poetry, sometimes owing to the alteration of the natural order of words for metrical reasons.

"Eduardum occidere nolite timere bonum est." — Edward II by Christopher Marlowe

Isabella of France and Roger Mortimer, 1st Earl of March supposedly plotted to murder Edward II of England in such a way as not to draw blame on themselves, sending this order in Latin which changes meaning depending on where the comma is placed.

- Do not be afraid to kill Edward; it is good. (either killing Edward or not being afraid to kill him is good)
- Do not kill Edward; it is good to fear. (The act of killing Edward is good to fear)

"I'm glad I'm a man, and so is Lola" from the song "Lola" by the Kinks (written by Ray Davies)
- Lola and I are both glad I'm a man.
- I'm glad I'm a man, and Lola is also a man.
- I'm glad I'm a man, and Lola is also glad to be a man.

"John saw the man on the mountain with a telescope."
- John, using a telescope, saw a man on a mountain.
- John saw a man on a mountain which had a telescope on it.
- John saw a man, who had a telescope, on a mountain.
- John, on a mountain and using a telescope, saw a man.
- John, on a mountain, saw a man who had a telescope.

"The word of the Lord came to Zechariah, son of Berekiah, son of Iddo, the prophet." – Zechariah 1:7
- ... the prophet Zechariah, who was the son of Berekiah, who was the son of Iddo
- ... Zechariah, who was the son of the prophet Berekiah, who was the son of Iddo
- ... Zechariah, who was the son of Berekiah, who was the son of the prophet Iddo
- ... the prophet Zechariah, who was the son of Berekiah and Iddo
- ... Zechariah, who was the son of Berekiah and the prophet Iddo

Lesbian Vampire Killers, the title of a 2009 comedy-horror film
- Lesbians who kill vampires.
- Killers of lesbian vampires.
- Lesbian vampires that are killers.

"The Purple People Eater", a 1958 novelty song by Sheb Wooley
- A purple creature that eats people.
- A creature that eats purple people. (This interpretation is confirmed in the lyrics, although whether the creature itself is also purple is never made clear.)

"British Left Waffles on Falkland Islands", a 1982 headline in The Guardian
- The left-leaning British political party is indecisive about Falkland Island policy.
- British people are responsible for leaving waffles (the breakfast item) on the Falkland Islands.

Aristotle writes about the influence of ambiguities on arguments, and states that this influence depends on either combination or division of words:

... if one combines the words 'to write-while-not-writing': for then it means, that he has the power to write and not to write at once; whereas if one does not combine them, it means that when he is not writing he has the power to write.

— Aristotle, Sophistical refutations, Book I, Part 4

== In headlines ==
Newspaper headlines are often written in headlinese, a compressed register that frequently omits function words such as the copula. This omission can create syntactic ambiguity, often in the form of garden-path sentences, in which an initial interpretation turns out to be incorrect. The term crash blossom was coined by Dan Bloom in the Testy Copy Editors discussion group to describe such headlines. The name comes from the headline "Violinist linked to JAL crash blossoms" which initially appears to describe a Japan Air Lines plane crash involving "blossoms", rather than a violinist whose career blossomed after being linked to the crash.

The Columbia Journalism Review has reprinted crash blossom headlines in the column "The Lower Case" and has published anthologies of them called "Squad Helps Dog Bite Victim" and "Red Tape Holds Up New Bridge". The Language Log blog has an extensive archive of crash blossoms, including:

- "Woman burned as a baby tracks down nurse who cared for her" – Chicago Tribune, 2015
- "Knife crime: St John Ambulance to teach teens to help stab victims" – BBC News, 2021
- "Driving waste and recycling innovation for the world" – ad for University of New South Wales, 2019
- "German factory orders slide unexpectedly" – The Guardian, 2015

Many purported crash blossoms are apocryphal or recycled. One celebrated example from World War I is "French push bottles up German rear", which was echoed in the Second World War headline "Eighth Army Push Bottles Up Germans".

== In humour and advertising ==
Structural ambiguities may also be intentionally created when one understands the kinds of syntactic structures that will lead to ambiguity; however, for the respective interpretations to work, they must be compatible with semantic and pragmatic contextual factors.

== Syntactic and semantic ambiguity ==
In syntactic ambiguity, the same sequence of words is interpreted as having different syntactic structures. In contrast, in semantic ambiguity the structure remains the same, but the individual words are interpreted differently. Controlled natural languages are often designed to be unambiguous so that they can be parsed into a logical form.

== Kantian ==
Immanuel Kant employs the term "amphiboly" in a sense of his own, as he has done in the case of other philosophical words. He means it as a confusion of pure understanding with perceived experience, and an attribution to the latter of what belongs only to the former.

== Models ==
=== Competition-based model ===
Competition-based models hold that differing syntactic analyses rival each other when syntactic ambiguities are resolved. If probability and language constraints offer similar support for each one, especially strong competition occurs. On the other hand, when constraints support one analysis over the other, competition is weak and processing is easy. After van Gompel et al.'s experiments (2005), the reanalysis model has become favoured over competition-based models. Convincing evidence against competition-based models includes the fact that globally ambiguous sentences are easier to process than disambiguated (clearer) sentences, showing that the analyses do not compete against each other in the former. Plausibility tends to strengthen one analysis and eliminate rivalry. However, the model has not been completely rejected. Some theories claim that competition makes processing difficult, if only briefly.

=== Reanalysis model ===
According to the reanalysis model, processing is hard once the reader has realised that their analysis is false (with respect to the already adopted syntactic structure) and they must then return and recheck the structure. Most reanalysis models, like the unrestricted race model, work in series, which implies that only one analysis can be supported at a time.

Consider the following statements:

1. "The dog of the woman that had the parasol was brown."
2. "The woman with the dog that had the parasol was brown."
3. "The dog with the woman that had the parasol was brown."

Research supports the reanalysis model as the most likely reason for why interpreting these ambiguous sentences is hard. Results of many experiments tracking the eye-movements of subjects have demonstrated that it is just as hard to process a persistently ambiguous sentence (1) as an unambiguous sentence (2 and 3) because information before the ambiguity only weakly leans towards each possible syntax.

=== Unrestricted race model ===
The unrestricted race model states that analysis is affected before the introduction of ambiguity and affects which meaning is used (based on probability) before multiple analyses can be introduced. Gompel and Pickering plainly refer to the unrestricted race model as a two-stage reanalysis model. Unlike constraint-based theories, only one analysis can be made at any one time. Thus, reanalysis may sometimes be necessary if information following the first analysis proves it wrong.

However, the name "unrestricted race" comes directly from its properties taken from the constraint-based models. As in constraint-based theories, any source of information can support the different analyses of an ambiguous structure; thus the name. In the model, the other possible structures of an ambiguous sentence compete in a race, with the structure that is constructed fastest being used. The more such an analysis is supported, and the stronger the support is, the more likely this one will be made first.

Consider the following statements:

1. "The maid of the princess who scratched herself in public was terribly humiliated."
2. "The son of the princess who scratched himself in public was terribly humiliated."
3. "The son of the princess who scratched herself in public was terribly humiliated."

Research showed that people took less time to read persistently ambiguous sentences (sentence 1) than temporarily ambiguous sentences that were clarified later (sentences 2 and 3). In sentences 2 and 3, the reflexive pronouns "himself" and "herself" clarify that "who scratched" is modifying the son and the princess respectively. Thus, the readers are forced to reanalyse and their reading times will therefore rise. In sentence 1, however, the ambiguity of the reflexive pronoun "herself" fits both the maid and the princess. This means the readers do not have to reanalyse. Thus, ambiguous sentences will take a shorter time to read compared to clarified ones.

This is called the underspecification account as readers do not stick to a meaning when not provided with clarifying words. The reader understands someone scratched herself but does not seek to determine whether it was the maid or the princess. This is also known as the "good-enough" approach to understanding language.

== The good-enough approach ==
The good-enough approach to understanding language claims that representations of meaning are usually incomplete and language processing only partial. A good-enough interpretation may occur when such a representation is not robust, supported by context, or both and must handle potentially distracting information. Thus, such information is clipped for successful understanding.

== Differences in processing ==
=== Children and adults ===
Children interpret ambiguous sentences differently from adults due to lack of experience. Children have not yet learned how the environment and contextual clues can suggest a certain interpretation of a sentence. They have also not yet developed the ability to acknowledge that ambiguous words and phrases can be interpreted multiple ways. As children read and interpret syntactically ambiguous sentences, the speed at which initial syntactic commitments are made is lower in children than in adults. Furthermore, children appear to be less skilled at directing their attention back to the part of the sentence that is most informative in terms of aiding reanalysis. Other evidence attributes differences in interpreting ambiguous sentences to working memory span. While adults tend to have a higher working memory span, they sometimes spend more time resolving the ambiguity but tend to be more accurate in their final interpretation. Children, in contrast, can decide quickly on an interpretation because they consider only the interpretations their working memory can hold.

=== Low reading span vs. high reading span adults ===
For low reading span adults who had the worst verbal working memory, they took longer to process the sentences with the reduced relative clause compared to the relative clause and had similar times from inanimate or animate subjects. For high reading span subjects who had the best verbal working memory, they were overall faster than the low reading span subjects. Within the high reading span subjects, however, they responded faster to inanimate subjects and took longer to respond to animate subjects. This was because the animate subjects had a greater propensity to create a garden-path sentence because of (not despite) greater verbal working memory. This suggested that since the low reading span subjects had less cognitive resources, only syntactic cues could be processed while high reading span subjects had more cognitive resources and could thus get tripped up with the garden-path sentence.

== See also ==
- Ambiguous grammar – Type of context-free grammar
- Dangling modifier – Type of misplaced grammatical phrase
- Eats, Shoots & Leaves – 2003 non-fiction book on punctuation by Lynne Truss
- Elegant variation – Use of synonyms to avoid repetition
- Equivocation – Misleading use of a term with multiple meanings
- Ibis redibis nunquam per bella peribis – Latin phrase
- List of linguistic example sentences
- Natural language processing – Processing of natural language by a computer
- Paraprosdokian – Figure of speech
- Reading span task – Verbal working memory test
- Serial comma – Comma before the conjunction in a list
- "The Purple People Eater" – 1958 single by Sheb Wooley
- Transderivational search – Term in psychology and cybernetics
