= Memory technique =

Memory technique may refer to:

== In psychology and cognitive sciences ==
- Art of memory
- Memory improvement techniques
  - Mnemonics

== In computer science ==
- Memory management
