= Lyn Mikel Brown =

American writer, activist, and academic (born 1956)

- Born: February 12, 1956 (age 70); Vanceboro, Maine, U.S.
- Children: 1
- Awards: Maine Women's Hall of Fame, 2013

Academic background
- Education: Ottawa University (BS); Harvard Graduate School of Education (EdD)
- Thesis: [Thesis "Narratives of Relationship: The development of a care voice in girls ages 7 to 16"] (1989)
- Doctoral advisor: Carol Gilligan

Academic work
- Discipline: Education and human development
- Institutions: Colby College
- Main interests: Girl development, youth activism, sexualization and objectification of girls by the media and marketers
- Notable works: Meeting at the Crossroads: Women's psychology and girls' development (1992, with Carol Gilligan)
- Website: http://web.colby.edu/lynmikelbrown/

Lyn Mikel Brown (born February 12, 1956) is an American academic, author, feminist, and community activist. She is Professor of Education Emerit at Colby College in Waterville, Maine. Her research interests include girls' development, youth activism, and the impact of media and marketing on youth. She is a co-founder of the research-driven nonprofit, Hardy Girls Healthy Women, and SPARK, a girl-fueled anti-racist gender justice movement. She has authored seven books, many peer-reviewed articles, general media essays, and book chapters. She was inducted into the Maine Women's Hall of Fame in 2013.

== Early life and education ==
Lyn Mikel Brown was born in Vanceboro, Maine, to Linwood C. Brown, a railroad engineer, and Diana A. Main Brown, a nurse. She has two brothers and a sister.

After graduating from Calais High School, she studied psychology at the University of Maine from 1974 to 1976, sociology at the University of Kent from 1976 to 1977, and psychology at Ottawa University from 1977 to 1979; she earned her bachelor's degree at the latter institution. From 1983 to 1989 she pursued her graduate degree at Harvard Graduate School of Education, earning her Ed.D. in human development and psychology. She did post-doctoral research in the Harvard Project on Women's Psychology and Girls' Development at the Harvard Graduate School of Education from 1989 to 1991, and also taught for a year at HGSE.

== Career ==
In 1991 Brown joined the faculty of Colby College as assistant professor of education and human development. She was promoted to associate professor in 1998 and to full professor in 2005.

In 2000 she co-founded Hardy Girls Healthy Women, a research-driven nonprofit. Through the HGHW Girls' Advisory Board, she initiated the online teen blog and youth activism website, Powered by Girl. In 2010 she co-founded, with Deborah Tolman, the girl-fueled SPARK activist movement. Among the latter group's efforts was a 2012 Change.org petition against Lego Friends for targeting girls with a line of skinny, buxom female characters.

== Writing ==
Brown's first book, co-authored with Carol Gilligan, was Meeting at the Crossroads: Women's psychology and girls' development (1992), which focused attention on a previously little-studied stage of female development, the transition from girlhood to adolescence, and introduced the "Listener's Guide" as a research tool. The book was named one of the New York Times Notable Books of the Year. For her 2003 book, Girlfighting: Betrayal and rejection among girls, Brown interviewed more than 400 girls in grades 1 through 12 to explore the hypothesis that gossiping, backstabbing, and cliquishness stem from pressure to live up to society's idea of the perfect female. She co-authored, with Sharon Lamb, a pair of books on the sexualization of teens in the media and marketing, Packaging Girlhood: Rescuing our daughters from marketers' schemes (2006) and Packaging Boyhood: Saving our sons from superheroes, slackers, and other media stereotypes (2009); her partner, Mark Tappan, was a co-author on the latter book. Powered By Girl: A Field Guide for Supporting Youth Activists (2016), is a playbook for adults who want to support girls' organizing. Her most recent book,Trauma-Responsive Schooling: Centering Student Voice and Healing (2022), encourages educators to upend traditional classroom power dynamics by validating student experiences and expertise.

She has co-authored seven curricula, including From Adversaries to Allies: A Curriculum For Change, currently in its fourth edition, which has been used in more than 100 girls' empowerment groups statewide and in 41 U.S. states. She has also written many peer-reviewed articles, general media articles, and book chapters.

Brown served as a member of the American Psychological Association Presidential Task Force on Adolescent Girls and was a consultant to the Ms. Foundation for Women's National Girls' Initiative in 1994.

== Awards and honors ==
In 2006 she was a co-winner, with Lauren Sterling, of the Groundbreaking Activist Leader Award from the Maine International Film Festival, for co-producing a documentary on the play Ugly Ducklings, which addresses homophobia and youth suicide. She was named College Professor of the Year by the Academy of Education Arts and Sciences International in 2014. She was inducted into the Maine Women's Hall of Fame in 2013.

== Personal life ==
Brown and her partner, Mark Tappan, also a professor of education Emerit at Colby College, have one daughter and reside in Waterville. In 2012 their then-seventeen-year-old daughter Maya, a blogger for SPARK Movement, was one of three girls interviewed by Katie Couric on the Katie show about their objections to the way the media portrays teen girls.

== Selected bibliography ==
=== Books ===
- Trauma-Responsive Schooling: Centering Student Voice and Healing. Harvard Education Press. 2022. ISBN 978-1-68253-731-2.
- Powered by Girl: A field guide for working with youth activists. Beacon Press. 2016. ISBN 978-0807094600.
- Packaging Boyhood: Saving our sons from superheroes, slackers, and other media stereotypes. Macmillan. 2009. ISBN 978-1429983259. (with Sharon Lamb and Mark Tappan)
- Packaging Girlhood: Rescuing our daughters from marketers' schemes. Macmillan. 2006. ISBN 1429906324. (with Sharon Lamb)
- Girlfighting: Betrayal and rejection among girls. NYU Press. 2003. ISBN 0814787061.
- Raising Their Voices: The politics of girls' anger. Harvard University Press. 1999. ISBN 0674747216.
- Meeting at the Crossroads: Women's psychology and girls' development. Harvard University Press. 1992. ISBN 0674564642. (with Carol Gilligan; reprinted 2013)
