= Ibis redibis nunquam per bella peribis =

Latin phrase

Ibis redibis nunquam per bella peribis (alternatively Ibis redibis nunquam in bello morieris) is a Latin phrase, often used to illustrate the meaning of syntactic ambiguity to students of either Latin or linguistics. Traditionally, it is attributed to the oracles of Dodona. The phrase is thought to have been uttered by a general consulting the oracle about his fate in an upcoming battle. The sentence is crafted in a way that, without punctuation, it can be interpreted in two significantly different ways.

== Meanings and translation ==
Ibis, redibis, nunquam per bella peribis.

Meaning "you will go, you will return, never in war will you perish". The other possibility is the exact opposite in meaning:

Ibis, redibis nunquam, per bella peribis.

That is: "you will go, you will return never, in war you will perish".

=== Greek parallel ===
A Greek parallel expression with the same meaning is also current: ἤξεις ἀφήξεις, οὐ θνήξεις ἐν πολέμῳ ("Íxeis afíxeies, ou thníxeis en polémo"). While Greek authorities have in the past assumed this was the original Dodona oracle (e.g. first edition of Babiniotis dictionary), no ancient instance of the expression is attested, and a future form corresponding to the rhyming θνήξεις, thníxeis (instead of the classical θανεῖ, thaneí), is first attested from the reign of Nero (Greek Anthology 9.354). The Greek expression is therefore probably a modern back-translation from the Latin.

=== Contemporary usage ===
To say that something is an ibis redibis, usually in the context of legal documents, is to say that its wording is (either deliberately or accidentally) confusing or ambiguous.

The Austrian writer Peter Handke uses the phrase as an epigraph to his books Die Hornissen and Crossing the Sierra de Gredos.

== See also ==
- Eats, Shoots & Leaves
