= Working memory training =

Psychological training

Working memory training is intended to improve a person's working memory. Working memory is a central intellectual faculty, linked to IQ, ageing, and mental health. It has been claimed that working memory training programs are effective means both for treating specific medical conditions associated with working memory deficit and for generally increasing cognitive capacity among healthy adults.

Individual studies of the topic show different and sometime contradictory results and, as one meta-study states, asking the question "Does cognitive training improve intelligence?" is as inappropriate as asking "Does medicine cure disease?", since neither of them specify which particular intervention (which training program or medicine) is being evaluated, for alleviating which condition is it applied (ADHD, stroke, general cognitive improvement etc.), and under what circumstances is it administered (selection criteria, adherence rate, outcome variables, etc.).

An influential metastudy from 2012, highly critical to cognitive training, analysed 23 studies with 30 group comparisons and concluded that clinical memory training programs produce reliable short-term improvements in working memory skills in children and adults with ADHD, but also that there is no evidence that such effects can be maintained long-term without additional follow-up training. Three years later, another metastudy reached the opposite conclusion: that working memory training does have consistent and useful effects, not just on the type of working memory tests that are practiced, but also at other non-trained tasks and everyday life. Since then, a range of additional clinical experiments have been completed, with larger sample sizes, clearly defined control groups, and more uniform treatment of outcome variables. While the evidence is still far from unanimous, several experimental studies of working memory training have shown beneficial effects for people with ADHD, those who have suffered stroke or traumatic brain injury, children who have undergone cancer treatment, as well as for normally developing children.

== Working memory ==
Working memory (WM) is the system which holds multiple pieces of transitory information in the mind – information that is needed for different tasks right now. Working memory differs from short-term memory in that it is the storage and manipulation of information, while short-term is solely the storage of information in a readily available state. Therefore, short-term memory is a component of working memory. Working memory capacity is usually assessed by determining the number of pieces of information that a person can hold in their mind at once. For example, a person might be asked to listen to a series of digits and letters, sort them into order in mind, and then recall the sorted list aloud. The longest set of characters or other items that can reliably be recalled is the working memory capacity.

The capacity of working memory differs between people: a person able to recall eight instructions has a greater working memory capacity than someone who can only recall a series of five. Numerous scientific studies have linked working memory capacity with strength in other fundamental cognitive abilities, including attention and intelligence. Conversely, poor working memory is assumed to be one of the core deficits in ADHD as well as a number of learning disabilities.

== Tasks ==
Working memory training tasks are conducted on computers and are often paired with positive reinforcement, feedback of the individual's performance, and other motivational features such as displaying the individual's current score beside their personal best score. Practicing these tasks demands numerous processes such as encoding, inhibition, maintenance, manipulation, shifting and controlling attention, and the ability to manage two tasks simultaneously or dividing attention. Possible forms of the tasks include recalling a series of locations of items on the screen, recalling digits or letters in either the order presented or reverse order, or recalling specifically where a particular number or digit was in a sequence. Computers are additionally programmed to adjust the difficulty of the task to the individual's performance with each trial in order to maximize learning and overall improvement. If the individual does poorer on one trial, the difficulty will decrease. Similarly, if the individual excels on the next few trials, the difficulty will increase. Two ways of altering the difficulty are adjusting the number of stimuli to be remembered and adding visual distractions.

== Strategies ==
Common strategies used in working memory training include repetition of the tasks, giving feedback such as tips to improve one's performance to both the parents and the individual, positive reinforcement from those conducting the study as well as parents through praise and rewarding, and the gradual adjustment of the task difficulty from trial to trial. More explicitly used strategies by the individual include rehearsal of material, chunking, pairing mental images with the material, mnemonics, and other meta-cognitive strategies. The latter strategies have been learned and there is a conscious awareness of their use.

Exercise is also an important strategy in improving working memory. When complex motor learning is paired with specific working memory demands, engaging in long-term coordinative exercise may enhance the brain's ability to share neural resources when managing similar working memory tasks. Additionally, different exercise strategies were found to be beneficial for adults compared to adolescents.

== Training setup and evaluation ==
Before training commences, participants complete pre-training verbal and visuo-spatial tasks, which are additionally completed in the study's follow-up as post-training tasks. Pre-training and post-training tasks vary, some studies use verbal and visuo-spatial tasks along with slightly different tasks; referred to as "nontrained tasks." Klingberg et al. used visuo-spatial tasks, a Span board, the Stroop task, Raven's coloured progressive matrices, and a choice reaction time task, during pre-training and post-training. Holmes et al. used a nonword recall task, mazes memory task, listening recall, and the "odd one-out" task. By using tasks that differ from ones in the study, laboratory results can demonstrate transfer effects if high scores are achieved, since these were not learned during training.

The training itself is set up in studies so that participants attend a set number of sessions over a given period of time that widely varies between studies. This can vary anywhere from two weeks to a span of eight weeks. The time spent in sessions also ranges, with some studies being as short as fifteen minutes to other studies lasting forty minutes. Studies can take place in the lab, or even at home with researchers keeping in touch through weekly phone calls. There is no universal way to set up the training schedule, since all schedules tended to vary to at least to some degree. The effects are tested immediately after training is completed and again a few months after, or even up to a year later, to see if the training outcomes are still in place. Testing and evaluation can be based on the measures of academic efficiency, ratings of the individual's symptoms from teachers and parents, comparing the experimental to the control groups of the study, and self-report measures.

== Transfer effects ==
There are many possible transfer effects from working memory training. An increase in working memory capacity could make individuals more likely to take on tasks that have a higher working memory load, such as math and other challenging academics. Holmes et al. reported an improvement in mathematical reasoning, even six months after training was completed. Furthermore, there has been parent reported decreases of inattentive behaviours, hyperactivity, and impulsivity in children with ADHD, in addition to a decrease in motor activity. However the majority of transfer effects are seen in lab-based nontrained tasks that are completed during follow-up and immediately after training is over. A meta-analysis into 30 studies assessing the effects of various Working Memory Training found that WM training has short term reliable effects but the effectiveness in the long term is limited. Another study found that using a demanding action video game could be beneficial to basic processes such as spatial cognition and rapid perception but that using a non-action 3D puzzle game showed improvements that were not transferable from the game itself. Findings from these results vary according to which nontrained tasks the researcher chooses to use. The main general finding in these studies confirms that experimental groups improve on trained tasks in comparison to control groups, and that effects will need retraining to maintain.

Along with reported decreases of inattentive behaviours, hyperactivity, and impulsivity in children with ADHD, a pilot study done on adults after experiencing a stroke found that systematic working memory training can improve working memory and attention. This study also contained a self-rating on symptoms of cognitive failures both before and after the study. Eight out of the nine participants that completed the study reported fewer cognitive failures occurring in the post-study rating compared to prior to the study. Overall, the pilot study concludes that working memory training in adult patients that have previously had a stroke can both improve their cognitive function as measured by neuropsychological tests as well as improvements in subjective reports of cognitive failures.

Studies have also proven that working memory training can possibly help to improve deficits in working memory caused by anxiety and depression disorders, especially in adolescents. A trial study tested the WM of 733 adolescent participants, randomly assigning them to an active or placebo emotional working memory training. Emotional stimuli was used as the best way to see results because of the major influence anxiety and depression disorders have on emotional regulation. After 4 weeks of bi-weekly training, results showed improvements in working memory, both short-term and long-term emotional functioning, and even an increase in self esteem among the active group. While improvements in WM were observed in both groups, there were many limitations and further research is still needed to produce training that will create long term effects in those who suffer from mental health disorders such as anxiety and depression.

Although some studies published have argued that working memory training has the ability to improve overall intelligence, more recent literature suggests that working memory training does not transfer to other cognitive ability tests. It also suggests that the conclusions drawn in the previous studies are a result of design limitations, mixed results, and a lack of theoretical grounding. The limitations are mostly found in the lack of controls in the previous studies. A paper that evaluated all previous literature on working memory training noted that not a single study had concurrently controlled for "motivation, commitment, and difficulty" in both the experimental and control groups. A few years after this paper was published, a randomized, placebo-controlled study was conducted to test the transfer effects of working memory training while controlling for all aspects previously mentioned. This study concluded that working memory training had no positive transfer to any of other cognitive ability tests including fluid intelligence, multitasking, crystallized intelligence, and perceptual speed.

== History ==
The concept of working memory became widely accepted and its importance better understood across the 1970s. At this time, a number of attempts to improve working memory were also initiated. For instance, in one case, a college student practiced repeating numbers that were read to him aloud for an hour each day. He did this three to five times a week for 20 months until he could repeat as many as 79 digits. While his capacity on this trained task had improved, his working memory: the ability to store information, as described above had not. This was most clearly demonstrated when, asked to repeat letters instead of numbers, this same student with over 320 hrs of practice at recalling digits could recall only six letters at a time: a normal to below average performance. The effect of the training was not to improve the working memory system but to change the information being stored: the student had learned multiple methods of grouping numbers and relating them to similar figures already in his long-term memory. In reality, his working memory capacity had not increased. This study and others like it contributed to the prevailing assumption in the scientific community that working memory is a set characteristic that cannot be improved.

== ADHD controversy ==
Many clinical studies published in 1990s and 2000s claim that working memory training is an efficient strategy for mitigating effects of ADHD and other cognitive disorders. Many studies also demonstrated that working memory training enhances episodic memory and could lead to better performance and improvements in fluid intelligence and processing speed tasks in the elderly.

Georgia Institute of Technology researchers who reviewed 17 studies on WMT concluded that "the results are inconsistent" due to the fact that many studies had "inadequate controls" as well as "ineffective measurement of the cognitive abilities of interest."

In 2012, a systematic meta-analytic review was undertaken. Stringent criteria for inclusion ensured that all studies were either randomized controlled trials or quasi-experiments. All studies had to have a treatment and a treated or untreated control group. By this time, some twenty-three studies met these criteria, including both clinical samples of typically developing children and adults. The results closely replicated the original finding by Ericcson et al. (1980): There were short-term improvements in practiced skills. While the results were conclusive for ADHD population, there was no convincing evidence for transfer or generalization effects (indicating improved capacity) in typically developing children and healthy adults."

Other researchers have studied the effects of training on children with attention issues. Among them are NYU, and the University of York. In addition, many researchers are now exploring the use of working memory training for various new applications, with studies having been completed or launched on normal and aging adults, pediatric cancer survivors, and victims of stroke and traumatic brain injury. In the February 2009 edition of Science, Klingberg and colleagues, led by F. McNab, claimed that adaptive span training had led to changes in dopamine D1 and D2 receptors. In the same study, tests of "far transfer" – whether or not the skills in one test applied to very different intelligence-related skills – were made. The results were not reported. (see supporting online materials). Moreover, research at the Wallenberg Neuroscience Center in Sweden indicates that working memory training may decrease hippocampal neurogenesis. When experimental medical scientists trained adult male rats in a working memory task for 4 or 14 days, rats trained for two weeks had fewer newborn hippocampal neurons than those that were only trained for 4 days. The report suggests that increased stress, caused by an intense training of working memory, can reduce the production of hippocampal neurons.

Lack of credible evidence of efficacy is increasingly highlighted in popular media.
