= Memory span =

Longest list of items one can memorize immediately

In psychology and neuroscience, memory span is the longest list of items that a person can repeat back in correct order immediately after presentation on 50% of all trials. Items may include words, numbers, or letters. The task is known as digit span when numbers are used. Memory span is a common measure of working memory and short-term memory. It is also a component of cognitive ability tests such as the Wechsler Adult Intelligence Scale (WAIS). Backward memory span is a more challenging variation which involves recalling items in reverse order.

== As a functional aspect ==
Functionally, memory span is used to measure the number of discrete units over which the individual can successively distribute their attention and still organize them into a working unit. To generalize, it refers to the ability of an individual to reproduce immediately, after one presentation, a series of discrete stimuli in their original order. Therefore memory span can be understood as the quantum of action of thought.

Experiments in memory span have found that the more familiar a person is with the type of subject matter presented to them, the more they will remember it in a novel setting. For example, a person will better remember a sequence in their first-language than their second-language; a person will also remember a sequence of words better than they would a sequence of nonsense syllables.

According to a theory by Alan Baddeley and Graham Hitch, working memory is under the influence of three key mechanisms: the visuospatial sketchpad, the central executive, and the phonological loop. A mechanism called the episodic buffer was later added to the model. The phonological loop is the mechanism that facilitates learning and memory by storing information (in the articulatory loop) and refreshing or rehearsing it in memory (in the acoustic store). The phonological similarity effect is when items in a list have similar features (e.g. similar sound), they are more difficult to remember. Likewise, the more different the items in a list are, the easier it is to recall them. Memory span tasks since the formulation of Baddeley and Hitch's theory have been helpful as support for the phonological loop as part of the working memory.

== As a structural aspect ==
A structural definition of memory span is difficult to give, for one immediately is faced by the distinctions between the prerequisites for memory span, and the actual processes involved. "Associability” is required in memory span. This term refers to the ability of the subject to group the series of elements together: to perceive relationships among the series in order to better reproduce them. Still, another process involved in memory span is that of imagery. The subject, in order to be able to reproduce the series presented, must be able to image the series. The actual reproducing of the series of stimuli involves the process of memory. If the individual possessed no memory at all, reproduction of the series would be impossible. It is also known that memory span and memory are different in the length of time over which reproduction is possible. Memory span is transitory; memory is fairly permanent. In addition, the amount of material involved in memory span is ordinarily much less than the amount of material involved in memory. Reproduction of the series also involves certain other "reproduction factors," such as language ability and arithmetical proficiency.

== Digit-span ==
A digit-span task is used to measure working memory's number storage capacity. Participants see or hear a sequence of numerical digits and are tasked to recall the sequence correctly, with increasingly longer sequences being tested in each trial. The participant's span is the longest number of sequential digits that can accurately be remembered. Digit-span tasks can be given forwards or backwards, meaning that once the sequence is presented, the participant is asked to either recall the sequence in normal or reverse order. Digit-span tasks are the most commonly used test for memory span, partially because performance on a digit-span task cannot be affected by factors such as semantics, frequency of appearance in daily life, complexity, etc.

Memory span
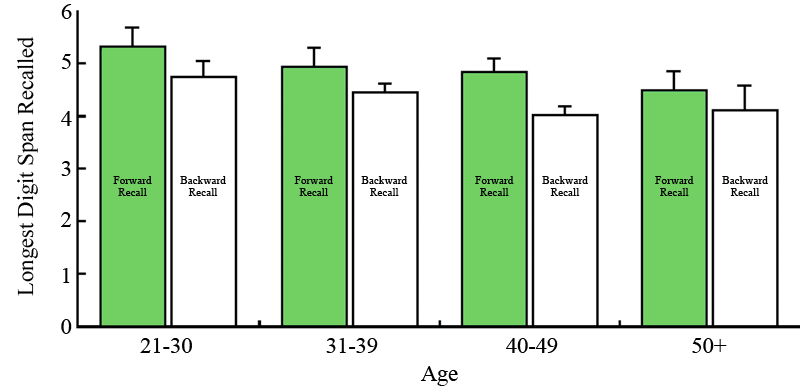
- This is a graphical representation of typical results that might be obtained from performing a forward/backward digit span recall task on participants in several different age groups. The numbers on the y-axis indicate number of digits successfully recalled.
- MeSH: D011581

Verbal working memory is involved in many everyday tasks, such as remembering a friend's telephone number while entering it into a phone and understanding long and difficult sentences. Verbal working memory is also thought to be one of the elements underlying intelligence (often referred to as IQ, meaning 'intelligence quotient'); thus, the digit span task is a common component of many IQ tests, including the widely used Wechsler Adult Intelligence Scale (WAIS). Performance on the digit span task is also closely linked to language learning abilities; improving verbal memory capacities may therefore aid mastery of a new language.

== Factors ==
There are a number of factors which affect memory span. Some of the factors are extrinsic, or present in the testing situation itself. These factors, if not carefully controlled, cause the memory span test to be statistically unreliable. While the existence of many of these factors have been recognized, extensive studies on their importance have yet to be done. Some of these extrinsic factors include stimulus grouping, response grouping, presentation rate, and S-R compatibility.

Other factors are intrinsic in the individual, and it is these factors which are the basis of "true" memory span. Though numerous factors affect memory span, the test is one that shows surprisingly high reliability. Results obtained by different investigators show that the reliability coefficients for memory span are quite high.

=== Extrinsic factors ===
1. Characteristics of materials used: If the material is all closely related, it will be more easily reproduced than if it is unrelated. This relationship of the material is called the "coefficient of associability." For example, in spoken word-span tasks if the words presented are phonologically similar a lower span is elicited than if the task uses phonologically different words.
2. Addition of non-target elements: the addition of irrelevant stimuli between target stimuli reduces performance on memory span tasks. If the irrelevant stimuli is a repeated syllable (i.e. ba, ba, ba) the span is reduced (articulatory suppression effect).
3. Rhythm of presentation: Closely related to the problem of presenting the stimuli in groups, is the presentation of the stimuli in rhythmic fashion. Most investigators point out that the stimuli used in testing memory span should be presented with as little rhythm as possible. The effect of rhythm is to group the units in the series, again enabling the individual to secure a span higher than their "true" one.
4. Rate of presentation: The speed with which the stimuli are presented has an effect on memory span score. When listening to auditory stimuli, the impact of speed is mediated by whether the subject is actively or passively listening. Active listeners score better with faster stimuli presentation. Passive listeners score better as time increases.
5. Modality of presentation: Studies have shown a consistent increase in memory span for lists presented auditorally over ones presented visually. This can be seen in performance on memory span tasks for signed languages, which typically yield lower spans than spoken languages.
6. Time required to vocalize responses: Memory span is approximately equal to the number of items which an individual can articulate in two seconds. With that in mind, memory span is consistently higher for short words than for long words. This factor helps account for cross-linguistic differences on digit memory span tasks.
7. Method of scoring responses: The method of scoring responses also has an effect upon the perceived memory span of the individual. Variations in scoring are common and should be considered when looking at data.
8. Distraction: Interference negatively effects performance on memory span tasks. Since distraction is harder to ignore at a young age, it is possible that interference may have a role in the differences of scores based on age.

=== Intrinsic factors ===
There are certain intrinsic factors specific to each individual that may affect the extent, or span, of one's working memory.

Age

An individual's age affects their working memory span. During childhood and adolescent development, memory span improves with age. After adulthood is reached, memory span slowly decreases as an individual progresses towards old age. The decline in memory span with old age has been associated with a decrease of working memory storage and processing, and the age difference in working memory becomes greater as the memory tasks performed become more difficult. Generally, the decline in working memory and memory span tasks in old age is attributed to a decline in overall cognitive control. One of the key aspects of working memory is the ability to inhibit distractions and to focus on stimulus cues. As a person ages, these abilities diminish, which reduces effective memory.

Practice of music

Musical training improves the verbal memory span, but there is no consensus among researchers if it improves visual working memory capacity. The more training received the better the memory improvement. Preschoolers given short-term musical training showed improvement in their executive function and verbal memory span. Sixty to eighty-five year-olds who received piano lessons showed a decrease of age-based memory decline, as well as improved executive function and working memory. Musicians also perform significantly better on the rhythm span test (the results of which correlate significantly with results of the digit span test). Musicians perform better on verbal tone-based memory span tasks than non-musicians; however they do not perform better than non-musicians if the tones in a verbal task are across multiple words.

== The memory span procedure ==
In a typical test of memory span, a list of random numbers or letters is read out loud or presented on a computer screen at the rate of one per second. The test begins with two to three numbers, increasing until the person commits errors. Recognizable patterns (for example 2, 4, 6, 8) should be avoided. At the end of a sequence, the person being tested is asked to recall the items in order. The average digit span for normal adults without error is seven plus or minus two. However, memory span can be expanded dramatically – in one case to 80 digits – by learning a sophisticated mnemonic system of recoding rules by which substrings of 5 to 10 digits are translated into one new chunk. In December 2019, Ryu Song I entered the Guinness Book of World Records for memorizing a sequence of 547 digits spoken aloud at the rate of one per second at the World Memory Championship in Wuhan, China.

In a backward digit span task, the procedure is largely the same, except that subjects being tested are asked to recall the digits in backward order (e.g., if presented with the following string of numbers "1 5 9 2 3," the subject would be asked to recall the digits in reverse order; in the case, the correct response would be "3 2 9 5 1").

Other memory span tests focus on both a processing task and a memory storage task. Generally, the task involves alternating between a task that requires mental processing and cognition, and a word or digit that needs to be memorized. For example, the processing question might involve the participant checking if an arithmetic problem is correct, or reading a sentence and answering a comprehension question about its meaning. The participant would then be presented with a word to memorize, before moving on to the next processing question. When the exercise is complete, the participant will try to recall as many words as possible. When Daneman and Carpenter investigated this method in 1980, they found a strong correlation between the number of words memorized and the comprehension performance for the processing questions. In other words, those who had a high memory span score and could recall many of the words also performed well on the processing questions.

== From simple span to complex span ==
Research in the 1970s has shown that memory span with digits and words is only weakly related to performance in complex cognitive tasks such as text comprehension, which are assumed to depend on short-term memory. This questioned the interpretation of memory span as a measure of the capacity of a central short-term memory or working memory. Daneman and Carpenter introduced an extended version of the memory span task which they called reading span.

The reading span task was the first instance of the family of complex span tasks, which differ from the traditional simple span tasks by adding a processing demand to the requirement to remember a list of items. In complex span tasks encoding of the memory items (e.g., words) alternates with brief processing episodes (e.g., reading sentences). For example, the operation span task combines verification of brief mathematical equations such as "2+6/2 = 5?" with memory for a word or a letter that follows immediately after each equation. Complex-span tasks have also been shown to be closely related to many other aspects of complex cognitive performance besides language comprehension, among other things to measures of fluid intelligence.

== The role of interference ==
There is the possibility that susceptibility to proactive interference (PI) affects performance on memory span measures. For older adults, span estimates increased with each PI-reducing manipulation; for younger adults, scores increased when multiple PI manipulations were combined or when PI-reducing manipulations were used in paradigms in which within-task PI was especially high. It is suggested that PI critically influences span performance. There might be the possibility that interference-proneness may influence cognitive behaviors previously thought to be governed by capacity.

PI-reducing procedures did act to improve span scores in many instances. The impact of PI is greater for older adults than for younger adults. Older adults showed relatively poor span performance when PI was maximal. By contrast, younger adults improved only when PI reductions were combined, suggesting that they are relatively resistant to PI. The fact that PI contributes to span performance raises a number of interesting possibilities with respect to previously held assumptions based on memory span performance. Working memory span tasks may measure interference-proneness in addition to capacity for both older and younger adults, suggest that resistance to interference may also affect performance on many cognitive tasks. Indeed, other studies show that individual differences in susceptibility to PI are predictive of scores on standard achievement tests.

== See also ==
- The Magical Number Seven, Plus or Minus Two
