= Sex Roles (journal) =

Peer-reviewed scientific journal

- Discipline: Gender roles
- Language: English
- Edited by: Rachel M. Calogero

Publication details
- History: 1975–present
- Publisher: Springer (United States)
- Frequency: Bimonthly
- Impact factor: 4.154 (2020)

Standard abbreviations
- ISO 4: Sex Roles

Indexing
- CODEN: SROLDH
- ISSN: 0360-0025 (print); 1573-2762 (web)
- LCCN: 75646987
- OCLC no.: 889390889

Links
- Online archive

Sex Roles is a peer-reviewed scientific journal. It was first published in 1975 by Plenum Publishing and is currently published by Springer, Plenum's corporate heir. Articles appearing in Sex Roles are written from a feminist perspective, and topics span gender role socialization, gendered perceptions and behaviors, gender stereotypes, body image, violence against women, gender issues in employment and work environments, sexual orientation and identity, and methodological issues in gender research. The Editor-in-Chief is Janice D. Yoder.

== Abstracting and indexing ==
Sex Roles is abstracted/indexed in:

- Abstracts in Anthropology
- Australian Domestic and Family Violence Clearinghouse
- Bibliosex
- Cabell's
- Cengage
- Criminal Justice Abstracts
- CSA/ProQuest
- Current Abstracts
- Current Contents/Social & Behavioral Sciences
- Dietrich's Index Philosophicus
- Educational Management Abstracts
- Educational Research Abstracts Online (ERA)
- Educational Technology Abstracts
- EMCare
- ERIH
- Expanded Academic
- Family & Society Studies Worldwide
- FRANCIS
- Gale
- Higher Education Abstracts
- Journal Citation Reports/Social Sciences Edition
- LGBT Life
- MathEDUC
- Multicultural Education Abstracts
- OCLC
- OmniFile
- PASCAL
- PsycINFO
- RILM Abstracts of Music Literature
- Scopus
- Social Sciences Citation Index
- Sociology of Education Abstracts
- Special Education Needs Abstracts
- Studies on Women & Gender Abstracts
- Technical Education & Training Abstracts
- TOC Premier

According to the Journal Citation Reports, the journal has a 2020 impact factor of 4.154, ranking it 1st out of 41 journals in the category "Women's Studies" and 11th out of 62 journals in the category, "Social Psychology".

== See also ==
- List of women's studies journals
