= Reading span task =

Verbal working memory test

The reading span task (RST) is a common memory span task widely cited in, and adapted for, investigations of working memory, cognitive processing, and reading comprehension that was first published by Meredyth Daneman and Patricia Carpenter in 1980. It is a verbal working memory test.

== Task ==
=== Original ===
The original RST required participants to read series of unconnected sentences aloud and to remember the final word of each sentence of a series (grouped according to the total number of sentences). With each sentence presented on a card, participants were cued to recall the memorized end-of-sentence words in their original order by a blank card at the end of a series. The number of sentences of a series was incrementally increased until a participant's reading span, or the maximum number of final words correctly recalled, was found.

The reading span task was the first instance of the family of "complex span" tasks (as opposed to "simple span" tasks). It is a complex verbal test because it draws upon both storage and processing (i.e., reading) elements of working memory, while simple verbal tests (e.g., word span) require the storage element alone.

=== Variants ===
Besides the "listening span" variant also developed by Daneman and Carpenter, several variants have been developed in recent years based upon the RST. Van den Noort et al. created a computerized version of the test, which, when tested among four different languages (Dutch, English, German, and Norwegian), was shown to meet strict methodological criteria of the original RST and yielded similar results. This allowed direct comparisons of RST results to be made across different language groups.

=== Problems ===
In an attempt to formulate a standardized version of the RST, numerous problems with both the original and variants have been critically examined.

== Findings ==
Daneman and Carpenter found that reading span was much more strongly related to reading comprehension than word span. Later research corroborated the finding that reading span is more closely related to language comprehension than word span.
