= LC4MP =

The Limited Capacity Model of Motivated Mediated Message Processing or LC4MP is an explanatory theory that assumes humans have a limited capacity for cognitive processing of information, as it associates with mediated message variables; moreover, they (viewers) are actively engaged in processing mediated information Like many mass communication theories, LC4MP is an amalgam that finds its origins in psychology. Specifically, this theory has its origins in the Limited Capacity Model for understanding cognitive information processing. The most fundamental assumptions of information processing are the three dimensions of cognitive processing. The three dimensions: 1) encoding, 2) storage, and 3) retrieval. This is how viewers get presented information into their heads. Messages can be processed under controlled conditions or they can be automatically elicited.

== Limited capacity theory ==
When a message processor decides to pay attention to a message because it appeals to their interests, and they allocate resources to information processing, the controlled message engagement sub process begins; conversely, when a message processor is cued automatically, and they are paying attention, the same process of allocating cognitive resources begins to elicit message processing. First, message engagement, which is a stimulus approach/avoidance interaction engages the appetitive and aversive cognitive sub processes. In the most lay terms, these are basic fight or flight responses that happen in mere nanoseconds. This information then can report to sensor stores in the brain; and if it is useful, it will move to short term memory and long term memory.

== Cognitive resources ==
There are several key concepts in the LC4MP: total resources, resources allocated, resources required, resources remaining, and resources available. Total resources refer to the total resources in the resource pool. Resources allocated refer to the resources that are actually available for a processing task. The resource allocated to a task may be equivalent to the total resources, but probably is not. Resources required are the amount of resources necessary to complete a task (See Total-Allocated-Required Resources.). Resources remaining refer to the difference between total resources and resources required. Resources available are the difference between the resources allocated and the resources required. Resources remaining and resources available may be the same if total resources are equivalent to resources allocated, but this is unlikely the case. See the overall picture of mental resources in information processing.

The reasons for these fine-tuned distinctions are several. First, people may not allocate all of the available resources to a task at hand because they are cognitive misers. Unless highly motivated, people tend to use as few resources as necessary. Thus, a distinction is made between total resources and allocated resources. Second, people will allocate resources only as required by the task. If people are watching a program they have seen before, fewer resources may be required because of the familiarity of the program. Conversely, if the production is such that the visual elements of the programming are important, then more resources may be required. In both cases, the same amount of resources may have been allocated to the TV program, but different amounts were actually used, leaving some allocated resources available in one case but not in another. Third, some elements in the environment will automatically draw resources. For example, formal features automatically attract attention (e.g., unrelated cuts), drawing required resources from the total pool of resources without conscious allocation of resources. In this case, the difference between the automatic attraction (i.e., required) of resources and the total resources leaves some remaining resources for allocation to other tasks.

Within this model, media messages may receive insufficient or limited processing for two basic reasons (i.e., cognitive overload). First, there may not be enough resources available to process the message fully (i.e., the required resources exceed the total resources). For example, a message on a topic that a person does not understand may require so many resources – perhaps trying to retrieve information from long-term memory – that, even though all resources may have been allocated to the task, the required resources for retrieval leave neither remaining nor available resources for attending to and encoding the message. Second, there may be enough resources available to process the message but those resources are not allocated to the task for reasons such as insufficient motivation or because the person is multitasking (e.g., resources required exceeds resources allocated). For example, when a person is cooking and watching TV at the same time, there may not be enough resources available to process the TV program entirely.

Watching TV involves a number of simultaneous cognitive processes. TV viewing often requires people to engage in processing auditory and visual information, and integrating these two channels of information. At the same time, both the auditory and visual information include the content of the program as well as the formal features of TV which can act as syntax for the programming. The viewer must integrate all of this information to understand the program. In addition, viewers are storing new information in memory and activating existing knowledge to aid in comprehending the program. Research under the rubric of the LC4MP focuses on how resources are allocated to the various processes that are occurring and the effects of differential resource allocation on attention, encoding, and retrieval.

== Encoding, storage, and retrieval ==
Encoding of information is a subprocess where a stimulus orients a person to a message, vel non. In terms of message processing, its effectiveness is determined by the number of cognitive resources allocated to the encoding process. If the person is exposed to a stimulus, and they choose to pay attention, the brain will treat that mediated message like it was reality. That is, the brain creates an "orienting response (OR), which is an automatic cognitive response to novel information". This response is a cognitive reaction to a change in the environment, and can be measured via implicit measures of recognition and explicit measures such as electrochemical reactions in the body. These cognitive processes can be both automatic, as in the case of OR's, or controlled. In either event, the next step in the message engagement process is to move the information into storage.

Storage is conceptually modeled as a cognitive sub-processing of information into and through the general associative network. Associative networks are conceptual “nodes” that map brain uses as sensor stores—for short-term and long term memory. They are conceptualized as the site where information is stored and ultimately retrieved. Under normal conditions, if there are many associative links available for information processing, “the more readily retrievable that information will become”; hence, then “retrieval” time of information is faster and more accessible. Storage of information is measured via cued recall.

Information retrieval is conceptualized as the third fundamental conceptual sub process of information processing, and it is a function of memory, which is measured via free recall. Measuring free recall is based on an individual's levels of sensitivity to stimuli, without being cued to the information.

== Cognitive memory ==
Automatic cognitive responses are elicited via a cognitive response to novel information, the primary method in which automatic responses are elicited is through structural cues of the communication situation. Lang, et al. (2000) elaborates on this by controlling the structural features. They discovered that the relatedness of the media messages mattered. They dissected the pacing of mediated content into two categories: one that used related editing in camera angle and content; and, another with unrelated cuts to unrelated information to the previous information that was being encoded and stored. These pacing cues are important to media producers because they can either help reinforce attention into memory; or they can create a low memory retention condition in the minds of the message processor.

By inserting edits, which are operationalized by the process of switching cameras or transitions in visual or audio media, media producers can elicit orienting responses in attentive viewers. This is accomplished because the mechanism of allocating resources to memory message processing is effective in low, medium, and high edit conditions. Therefore, retrieval is also possible and is measured via recognition testing. However, unlike related editing cues, unrelated cuts do not make it into memory, especially when the cuts are coming at the message processor rapidly. This is important, secondarily, because the entire illusion of a commercially driven media system is premised on the concept that advertising sells products. More importantly, this article's primary concern is to instruct media producers—who are concerned with generating public information, the importance of editing cues, and the deleterious uses of disparate advertising and its ineffectiveness.

== Methods ==
Methodologically, the LC4MP uses three primary sets of measures to study how people allocate resources and process information. Secondary task reaction time (STRT) is a measure of the amount of resources allocated to attention. STRT involves people engaging in a primary task such as watching TV while also monitoring a second task such as pressing a button whenever a cue such as a tone sounds or a light comes on. The amount of resources that are available (i.e., resources allocated minus resources required) has been demonstrated to influence how long it takes people to respond in the STRT. When there are a lot of resources available, people quickly notice the light or tone and are quick to press a button. But when resources are low or taxed, people take longer to notice the light or tone and are slower to respond. For example, a cut to an unrelated scene tends to tax resources because of the new information that needs to be processed, and STRT is slower. Critically, STRT is a function of both the resources allocated to the task and the resources required by the task.

A second set of methodological tools involves physiological measures such as heart rate, galvanic skin responses (sweating) or muscle activity. Heart rate is used as a measure of whether an orienting response has occurred. When people show an aroused response, their heart rate decelerates for a few seconds before returning toward their baseline. Likewise, an increase in skin conductance is evidence of an aroused response. Thus, the combined evidence of heart rate deceleration and an increase in skin conductance provides convergent evidence that an orienting response (OR) has occurred.

A final set of methodological tools involves measures of memory including recall and recognition measures. The measures of memory are used to make inferences about encoding and retrieval processes. For example, if messages are simple, increasing people's attention to a message through the inclusion of formal features that orient attention, such as edits, results in improvements in memory for the message. This finding suggests that there were available resources (i.e., more resources allocated than required) that could be diverted to encoding processes. Conversely, with a complex message, the addition of features that increase ORs tends to lead to decrements in memory, which suggests that ORs automatically drew resources away from encoding processes and resulted in worse memory. The decreased performance on memory tests is one indication that the resources required has exceeded the resources allocated to the task.

== Limits of LC4MP ==
The ability of information processing of mediated messages has limits. Interference with the encoding, storage, and retrieval of messages, especially when the receiver is not interested in the message, creates a situation where the required resources needed to process information are not dedicated; and, “fewer associative links will be made available to the message... therefore, it limits their ability to process media”. This is a concern for researchers interested in studying how people encode and store information because if information processors do not devote the appropriate number of resources required to process information, then information overload will inhibit the abilities of individuals to encode, store, and retrieve information. Additionally, the ability of information processors to process messages is also limited by their unique retrieval subprocessing abilities, which are related to perceptions compiled over time. Thus, the subprocess of retrieval is affected by two dimensions: “later retrieval – done after the fact – and concurrent retrieval - in real time – affect information processing of messages”.

== See also ==
- Media psychology
