= Working memory =

Cognitive system for temporarily holding information

Working memory is a cognitive system with a limited capacity that can hold information temporarily. It is important for reasoning and the guidance of decision-making and behavior. Working memory is often used synonymously with short-term memory, but some theorists consider the two forms of memory distinct, assuming that working memory allows for the manipulation of stored information, whereas short-term memory only refers to the short-term storage of information. Working memory is a theoretical concept central to cognitive psychology, neuropsychology, and neuroscience.

== History ==
The term "working memory" was coined by Miller, Galanter, and Pribram, and was used in the 1960s in the context of theories that likened the mind to a computer. In 1968, Atkinson and Shiffrin used the term to describe their "short-term store". The term short-term store was the name previously used for working memory. Other suggested names were short-term memory, primary memory, immediate memory, operant memory, and provisional memory. Short-term memory is the ability to remember information over a brief period (in the order of seconds). The term working memory became dominant in the field after Baddeley and Hitch showed in 1974 that a single module could not account for all kinds of temporary memory. Working memory is not completely distinct from short-term memory, and it has been defined in three slightly different ways: as short-term memory applied to cognitive tasks, as a multi-component system that holds and manipulates information in short-term memory, and as the use of attention to manage short-term memory.

The earliest mention of experiments on the neural basis of working memory can be traced back to more than 100 years ago, when Hitzig and Ferrier described ablation experiments of the prefrontal cortex (PFC); they concluded that the frontal cortex was important for cognitive rather than sensory processes. In 1935 and 1936, Carlyle Jacobsen and colleagues were the first to show the deleterious effect of prefrontal ablation on delayed response.

== Theories ==
Numerous models have been proposed for how working memory functions, both anatomically and cognitively. Of those, the two that have been most influential are summarized below.

=== The multicomponent model ===
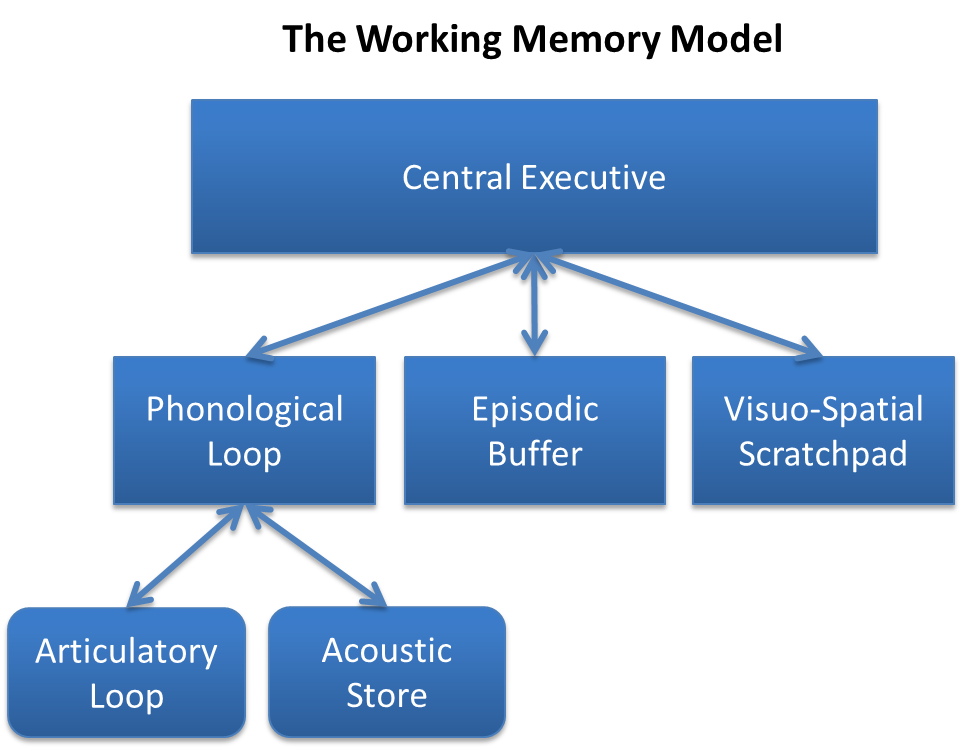
Baddeley and Hitch's model of working memory

In 1974 Baddeley and Hitch introduced the multicomponent model of working memory. The theory proposed a model containing three components: the central executive, the phonological loop, and the visuospatial scratchpad with the central executive functioning as a control center of sorts, directing info between the phonological and visuospatial components. The central executive is responsible for, among other things, directing attention to relevant information, suppressing irrelevant information and inappropriate actions, and coordinating cognitive processes when more than one task is simultaneously performed. A "central executive" is responsible for supervising the integration of information and for coordinating subordinate systems responsible for the short-term maintenance of information. One subordinate system, the phonological loop (PL), stores phonological information (that is, the sound of language) and prevents its decay by continuously refreshing it in a rehearsal loop. It can, for example, maintain a seven-digit telephone number for as long as one repeats the number to oneself repeatedly. The other subordinate system, the visuospatial sketchpad, stores visual and spatial information. It can be used, for example, for constructing and manipulating visual images and for representing mental maps. Robert Logie proposed that the sketchpad can be further broken down into a visual subsystem (dealing with such phenomena as shape, colour, and texture) and a spatial subsystem (dealing with location). Evidence for this division has been mixed, although one study found the capacities of shape and spatial working memory to be mostly independent.

In 2000 Baddeley extended the model by adding a fourth component, the episodic buffer, which holds representations that integrate phonological, visual, and spatial information, and possibly information not covered by the subordinate systems (e.g., semantic information, musical information). The episodic buffer is also the link between working memory and long-term memory. The component is episodic because it is assumed to bind information into a unitary episodic representation. The episodic buffer resembles Tulving's concept of episodic memory, but it differs in that the episodic buffer is a temporary store. It was renamed the awareness buffer in 2026.

Episodic buffer can also serve as a bridge between working memory and long term memory. The way this happens is by integrating information from sources into a single representation. The episodic buffer takes the verbal, visual and the semantic information and combines it to temporarily stores it to be able to use that information. Which allows the individual(s) to take the current experience and the previous stored experience and uses that information in reading, language processing and problem solving. The episodic buffer also helps explain how information from separate working memory systems can be combined into meaningful episodes and supports complex cognitive tasks that require information from multiple memory task (Baddeley, A.D. 2000).

=== Working memory as part of long-term memory ===
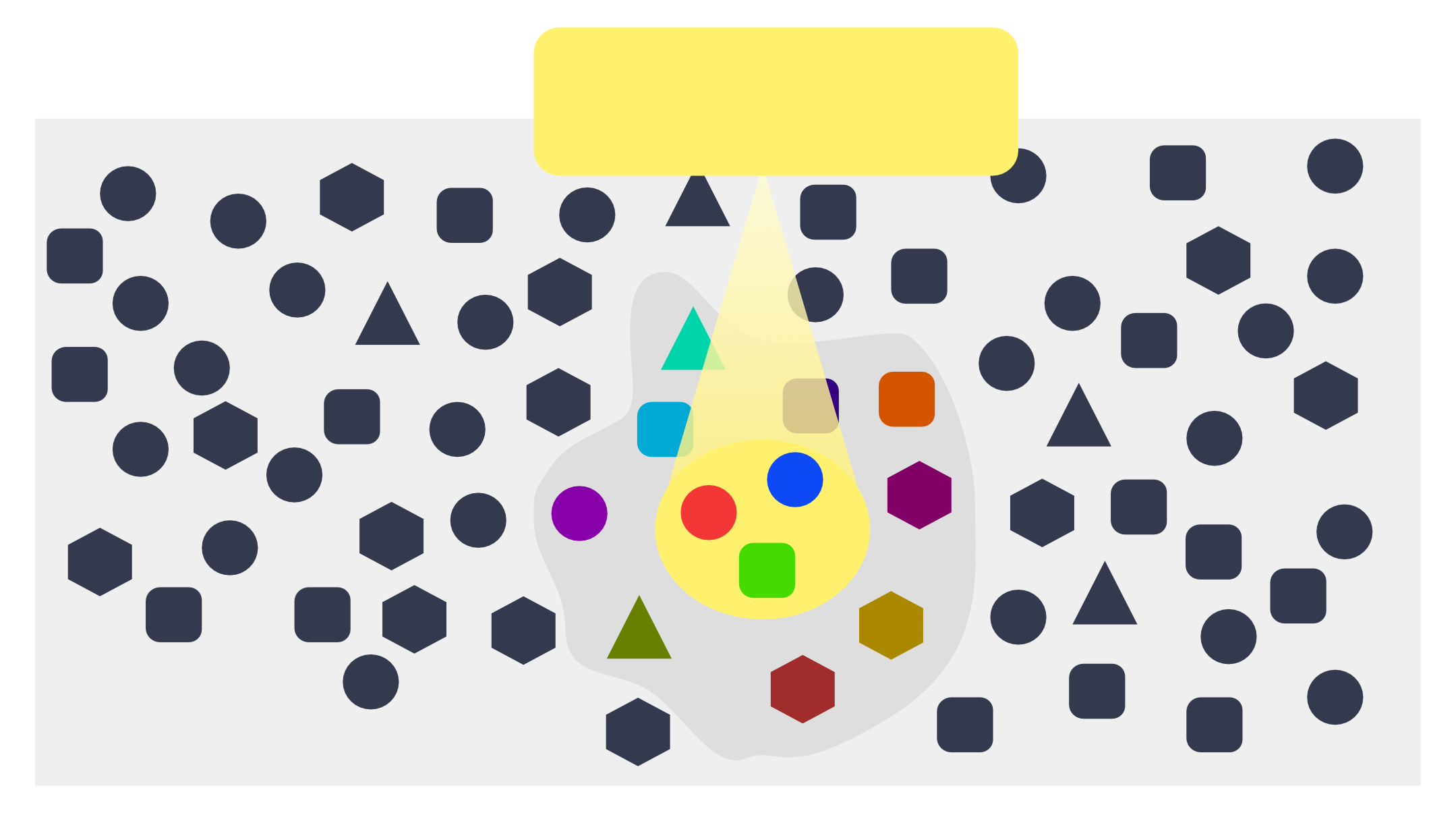
The central executive of working memory is retrieving memory from long-term memory.

Anders Ericsson and Walter Kintsch have introduced the notion of "long-term working memory", which they define as a set of "retrieval structures" in long-term memory that enable seamless access to the information relevant for everyday tasks. In this way, parts of long-term memory effectively function as working memory. In a similar vein, Cowan does not regard working memory as a separate system from long-term memory. Representations in working memory are a subset of representations in long-term memory. Working memory is organized into two embedded levels. The first consists of long-term memory representations that are activated. There can be many of these—there is theoretically no limit to the activation of representations in long-term memory. The second level is called the focus of attention. The focus is regarded as having a limited capacity and holds up to four of the activated representations.

Oberauer has extended Cowan's model by adding a third component—a more narrow focus of attention that holds only one chunk at a time. The one-element focus is embedded in the four-element focus and serves to select a single chunk for processing. For example, four digits can be held in mind at the same time in Cowan's "focus of attention". When the individual wishes to perform a process on each of these digits—for example, adding the number two to each digit—separate processing is required for each digit since most individuals cannot perform several mathematical processes in parallel. Oberauer's attentional component selects one of the digits for processing and then shifts the attentional focus to the next digit, continuing until all digits have been processed.

== Capacity ==
Working memory is widely acknowledged as having limited capacity. An early quantification of the capacity limit associated with short-term memory was the "magical number seven" suggested by Miller in 1956. Miller claimed that the information-processing capacity of young adults is around seven elements, referred to as "chunks", regardless of whether the elements are digits, letters, words, or other units. Later research revealed this number depends on the category of chunks used (e.g., span may be around seven for digits, six for letters, and five for words), and even on features of the chunks within a category. For instance, attention span is lower for longer words than short words. In general, memory span for verbal contents (digits, letters, words, etc.) depends on the phonological complexity of the content (i.e., the number of phonemes, the number of syllables), and on the lexical status of the contents (whether the contents are words known to the person or not). Several other factors affect a person's measured span, and therefore it is difficult to pin down the capacity of short-term or working memory to a number of chunks. Nonetheless, Cowan proposed that working memory has a capacity of about four chunks in young adults (and fewer in children and old adults).

In the visual domain, some investigations report no fixed capacity limit with respect to the total number of items that can be held in working memory. Instead, the results argue for a limited resource that can be flexibly shared between items retained in memory (see below in Resource theories), with some items in the focus of attention being allocated more resource and recalled with greater precision.

Whereas most adults can repeat about seven digits in correct order, some individuals have shown impressive enlargements of their digit span—up to 80 digits. This feat is possible by extensive training on an encoding strategy by which the digits in a list are grouped (usually in groups of three to five) and these groups are encoded as a single unit (a chunk). For this to succeed, participants must be able to recognize the groups as some known string of digits. One person studied by Ericsson and his colleagues, for example, used an extensive knowledge of racing times from the history of sports in the process of coding chunks: several such chunks could then be combined into a higher-order chunk, forming a hierarchy of chunks. In this way, only some chunks at the highest level of the hierarchy must be retained in working memory, and for retrieval the chunks are unpacked. That is, the chunks in working memory act as retrieval cues that point to the digits they contain. Practicing memory skills such as these does not expand working memory capacity proper: it is the capacity to transfer (and retrieve) information from long-term memory that is improved, according to Ericsson and Kintsch (1995; see also Gobet & Simon, 2000).

=== Measures and correlates ===
Working memory capacity can be tested by a variety of tasks. A commonly used measure is a dual-task paradigm, combining a memory span measure with a concurrent processing task, sometimes referred to as "complex span". Daneman and Carpenter invented the first version of this kind of task, the "reading span", in 1980. Subjects read a number of sentences (usually between two and six) and tried to remember the last word of each sentence. At the end of the list of sentences, they repeated back the words in their correct order. Other tasks that do not have this dual-task nature have also been shown to be good measures of working memory capacity. Whereas Daneman and Carpenter believed that the combination of "storage" (maintenance) and processing is needed to measure working memory capacity, we know now that the capacity of working memory can be measured with short-term memory tasks that have no additional processing component. Conversely, working memory capacity can also be measured with certain processing tasks that do not involve maintenance of information. The question of what features a task must have to qualify as a good measure of working memory capacity is a topic of ongoing research.

Recently, several studies of visual working memory have used delayed response tasks. These use analogue responses in a continuous space, rather than a binary (correct/incorrect) recall method, as often used in visual change detection tasks. Instead of asking participants to report whether a change occurred between the memory and probe array, delayed reproduction tasks require them to reproduce the precise quality of a visual feature, e.g. an object's location, orientation or colour. In addition, the combination of visual perception such as within objects and colors can be used to improve memory strategy through elaboration, thus creating reinforcement within the capacity of working memory.

Measures of working-memory capacity are strongly related to performance in other complex cognitive tasks, such as reading comprehension, problem solving, and with measures of intelligence quotient.

Some researchers have argued that working-memory capacity reflects the efficiency of executive functions, most notably the ability to maintain multiple task-relevant representations in the face of distracting irrelevant information; and that such tasks seem to reflect individual differences in the ability to focus and maintain attention, particularly when other events are serving to capture attention. Both working memory and executive functions rely strongly, though not exclusively, on frontal brain areas.

Other researchers have argued that the capacity of working memory is better characterized as the ability to mentally form relations between elements, or to grasp relations in given information. This idea has been advanced, among others, by Graeme Halford, who illustrated it by our limited ability to understand statistical interactions between variables. These authors asked people to compare written statements about the relations between several variables to graphs illustrating the same or a different relation, as in the following sentence: "If the cake is from France, then it has more sugar if it is made with chocolate than if it is made with cream, but if the cake is from Italy, then it has more sugar if it is made with cream than if it is made of chocolate". This statement describes a relation between three variables (country, ingredient, and amount of sugar). In these experiments performance declined as the number of interacting variables increased and fell to chance level with five variables, which Halford and colleagues interpret as a limit of about four variables that can be processed in parallel. On this view the limit is on the number of interrelationships between elements that can be kept active in reasoning, as distinct from the number of items that can be kept active in working memory, and both limits may rest on a limited ability to form and preserve bindings between elements in memory.

=== Experimental studies of working-memory capacity ===
There are several hypotheses about the nature of the capacity limit. One is that a limited pool of cognitive resources is needed to keep representations active and thereby available for processing, and for carrying out processes. Another hypothesis is that memory traces in working memory decay within a few seconds, unless refreshed through rehearsal, and because the speed of rehearsal is limited, we can maintain only a limited amount of information. Yet another idea is that representations held in working memory interfere with each other.

==== Decay theories ====
The assumption that the contents of short-term or working memory decay over time, unless decay is prevented by rehearsal, goes back to the early days of experimental research on short-term memory. It is also an important assumption in the multi-component theory of working memory. The most elaborate decay-based theory of working memory to date is the "time-based resource sharing model". This theory assumes that representations in working memory decay unless they are refreshed. Refreshing them requires an attentional mechanism that is also needed for any concurrent processing task. When there are small time intervals in which the processing task does not require attention, this time can be used to refresh memory traces. The theory therefore predicts that the amount of forgetting depends on the temporal density (rate and duration) of attentional demands of the processing task—this density is called cognitive load. The cognitive load depends on two variables, the rate at which the processing task requires individual steps to be carried out, and the duration of each step. For example, if the processing task consists of adding digits, then having to add another digit every half-second places a higher cognitive load on the system than having to add another digit every two seconds. In a series of experiments, Barrouillet and colleagues have shown that memory for lists of letters depends neither on the number of processing steps nor the total time of processing but on cognitive load.

==== Resource theories ====
Resource theories assume that the capacity of working memory is a limited resource that must be shared between all representations that need to be maintained in working memory simultaneously. Some resource theorists also assume that maintenance and concurrent processing share the same resource; this can explain why maintenance is typically impaired by a concurrent processing demand. Resource theories have been very successful in explaining data from tests of working memory for simple visual features, such as colors or orientations of bars. An ongoing debate is whether the resource is a continuous quantity that can be subdivided among any number of items in working memory, or whether it consists of a small number of discrete "slots", each of which can be assigned to one memory item, so that only a limited number of about 3 items can be maintained in working memory at all.

==== Interference theories ====
Several forms of interference have been discussed by theorists. One of the oldest ideas is that new items simply replace older ones in working memory. Another form of interference is retrieval competition. For example, when the task is to remember a list of 7 words in their order, we need to start recall with the first word. While trying to retrieve the first word, the second word, which is represented in proximity, is accidentally retrieved as well, and the two compete for being recalled. Errors in serial recall tasks are often confusions of neighboring items on a memory list (so-called transpositions), showing that retrieval competition plays a role in limiting our ability to recall lists in order, and probably also in other working memory tasks. A third form of interference is the distortion of representations by superposition: When multiple representations are added on top of each other, each of them is blurred by the presence of all the others. A fourth form of interference assumed by some authors is feature overwriting. The idea is that each item in working memory is represented as a set of features, and when two items share some features, they compete for them: the item that loses the competition gives up those features, and its representation is degraded. In the version proposed by Oberauer and Kliegl, this competition is not limited to adjacent items, so the model predicts that the more items are held in working memory, the more each of them is degraded.

==== Limitations ====
None of these hypotheses can explain the experimental data entirely. The resource hypothesis, for example, was meant to explain the trade-off between maintenance and processing: The more information must be maintained in working memory, the slower and more error prone concurrent processes become, and with a higher demand on concurrent processing memory suffers. This trade-off has been investigated by tasks like the reading-span task described above. It has been found that the amount of trade-off depends on the similarity of the information to be remembered and the information to be processed. For example, remembering numbers while processing spatial information, or remembering spatial information while processing numbers, impair each other much less than when material of the same kind must be remembered and processed. Also, remembering words and processing digits, or remembering digits and processing words, is easier than remembering and processing materials of the same category.

These findings are also difficult to explain for the decay hypothesis, because decay of memory representations should depend only on how long the processing task delays rehearsal or recall, not on the content of the processing task. A further problem for the decay hypothesis comes from experiments in which the recall of a list of letters was delayed, either by instructing participants to recall at a slower pace, or by instructing them to say an irrelevant word once or three times in between recall of each letter. Delaying recall had virtually no effect on recall accuracy. The interference theory seems to fare best with explaining why the similarity between memory contents and the contents of concurrent processing tasks affects how much they impair each other. More similar materials are more likely to be confused, leading to retrieval competition.

== Development ==
The capacity of working memory increases gradually over childhood and declines gradually in old age.

=== Childhood ===
Measures of performance on tests of working memory increase continuously between early childhood and adolescence, while the structure of correlations between different tests remains largely constant. Starting with work in the Neo-Piagetian tradition, theorists have argued that the growth of working-memory capacity is a major driving force of cognitive development. This hypothesis has received substantial empirical support from studies showing that the capacity of working memory is a strong predictor of cognitive abilities in childhood. Particularly strong evidence for a role of working memory for development comes from a longitudinal study showing that working-memory capacity at one age predicts reasoning ability at a later age. Studies in the Neo-Piagetian tradition have added to this picture by analyzing the complexity of cognitive tasks in terms of the number of items or relations that have to be considered simultaneously for a solution. Across a broad range of tasks, children manage task versions of the same level of complexity at about the same age, consistent with the view that working memory capacity limits the complexity they can handle at a given age. One experiment has correlated that a decrease of complexity regarding capacity limits are articulated from research concerning language processes, outlining the effect on the capacity of children with language disorders, having performed lower than their age-matched peers. A correlation between memory storage deficits can be viewed as a contribution due to these language disorders, or rather the cause of the language disorder, but has not fully suggested a deficit in being able to rehearse information.

Although neuroscience studies support the notion that children rely on prefrontal cortex for performing various working memory tasks, an fMRI meta-analysis on children compared to adults performing the n back task revealed a lack of consistent prefrontal cortex activation in children, while posterior regions including the insular cortex and cerebellum remain intact.

=== Aging ===
Working memory is among the cognitive functions most sensitive to decline in old age. Several explanations for this decline have been offered. One is the processing speed theory of cognitive aging by Tim Salthouse. Drawing on the finding that cognitive processes generally slow as people grow older, Salthouse argues that slower processing leaves more time for working memory content to decay, thus reducing effective capacity. However, the decline of working memory capacity cannot be entirely attributed to slowing because capacity declines more in old age than speed. Another proposal is the inhibition hypothesis advanced by Lynn Hasher and Rose Zacks. This theory assumes a general deficit in old age in the ability to inhibit irrelevant information. Thus, working memory should tend to be cluttered with irrelevant content that reduces effective capacity for relevant content. The assumption of an inhibition deficit in old age has received much empirical support but, so far, it is not clear whether the decline in inhibitory ability fully explains the decline of working memory capacity. An explanation on the neural level of the decline of working memory and other cognitive functions in old age has been proposed by West. She argues that working memory depends to a large degree on the prefrontal cortex, which deteriorates more than other brain regions as we grow old. The prefrontal cortex hemodynamics also play an important role in the impairment of working memory through a prevalence of sleeping disorders that many older adults face but it is not the only region that is influenced since other brain regions have demonstrated an output of influence within neuroimaging studies. Within the studies of fMRI, a connection between sleep deprivation was observed through a reduction of performance on the prefrontal cortex and a overall decrease in working memory performance. Age-related decline in working memory can be briefly reversed using low intensity transcranial stimulation to synchronize rhythms in prefrontal and temporal areas.

The neurobiological bases for reduced working memory abilities has been studied in aging macaques, who naturally develop impairments in working memory and the executive functions. Research has shown that aged macaques have reduced working memory-related neuronal firing in the dorsolateral prefrontal cortex, that arises in part from excessive cAMP-PKA-calcium signaling, which opens nearby potassium channels that weaken the glutamate synapses on spines needed to maintain persistent firing across the delay period when there is no sensory stimulation. Dysregulation of this process with age likely involves increased inflammation with age. Sustained weakness leads to loss of dendritic spines, the site of essential glutamate connections.

== Training ==
Some studies in the effects of training on working memory, including the first by Torkel Klingberg, suggest that working memory in those with ADHD can improve by training. This study found that a period of working memory training increases a range of cognitive abilities and increases IQ test scores. Another study by the same group has shown that, after training, measured brain activity related to working memory increased in the prefrontal cortex, an area that many researchers have associated with working memory functions. One study has shown that working memory training increases the density of prefrontal and parietal dopamine receptors (specifically, DRD1) in test subjects. However, subsequent experiments with the same training program have shown mixed results, with some successfully replicating, and others failing to replicate the beneficial effects of training on cognitive performance.

As research builds on working memory, Kleinberg found that working on memory training provides evidence that repeated practice on cognitive tasks that are adaptive can help improve performance on working memory. The studies from Kleinberg show that the improvements are aligned with the changes in neural activity within the brain regions involved in executive functioning (Kleinberg, T. 2010).

Another study involving children that have poor working memory have reported that adaptive working memory training have gotten back improved working memory results. Holmes and his research team have found that children who participated in the adaptive working memory training have improved their memory and continued to have that improvement long term, which can be suggested that children who are struggling with working memory can benefit from this training (Holmes j. , Gathercole S.E, Dunning D.L. 2009).

In another influential study, training with a working memory task (the dual n-back task) improved performance on a fluid intelligence test in healthy young adults. The improvement of fluid intelligence by training with the n-back task was replicated in 2010, but two studies published in 2012 failed to reproduce the effect. The combined evidence from about 30 experimental studies on the effectiveness of working-memory training has been evaluated by several meta-analyses. The authors of these meta-analyses disagree in their conclusions as to whether or not working-memory training improves intelligence. Yet these meta-analyses agree that, the more distant the outcome measure, the weaker is the causal link – training working memory almost always yields increases in working memory, often in attention, and sometimes in academic performance, but it is still an outstanding question what exact circumstances differs between cases of successful and unsuccessful transfer of effects.

Another research has founded that working memory training can produce more than just improvements in working memory, but also in fluid intelligence. Jaeggi and her research team reported that participants who completed adaptive working memory training demonstrated improvements on measures of fluid intelligence compared to the control participants (Jaeggi, Buschkuel, Jondides & Perrig 2008).

== In the brain ==
=== Neural mechanisms of maintaining information ===
The first insights into the neuronal and neurotransmitter basis of working memory came from animal research. The work of Jacobsen and Fulton in the 1930s first showed that lesions to the PFC impaired spatial working memory performance in monkeys. The later work of Joaquin Fuster recorded the electrical activity of neurons in the PFC of monkeys while they were doing a delayed matching task. In that task, the monkey sees how the experimenter places a bit of food under one of two identical-looking cups. A shutter is then lowered for a variable delay period, screening off the cups from the monkey's view. After the delay, the shutter opens and the monkey is allowed to retrieve the food from under the cups. Successful retrieval in the first attempt – something the animal can achieve after some training on the task – requires holding the location of the food in memory over the delay period. Fuster found neurons in the PFC that fired mostly during the delay period, suggesting that they were involved in representing the food location while it was invisible. Later research has shown similar delay-active neurons also in the posterior parietal cortex, the thalamus, the caudate, and the globus pallidus. The work of Goldman-Rakic and others showed that principal sulcal, dorsolateral PFC interconnects with all of these brain regions, and that neuronal microcircuits within PFC are able to maintain information in working memory through recurrent excitatory glutamate networks of pyramidal cells that continue to fire throughout the delay period. These circuits are tuned by lateral inhibition from GABAergic interneurons. The neuromodulatory arousal systems markedly alter PFC working memory function; for example, either too little or too much dopamine or norepinephrine impairs PFC network firing and working memory performance. A brain network analysis demonstrates that the FPC network requires less induced energy during working memory tasks than other functional brain networks. This finding underscores the efficient processing of the FPC network and highlights its crucial role in supporting working memory processes.

The research described above on persistent firing of certain neurons in the delay period of working memory tasks shows that the brain has a mechanism of keeping representations active without external input. Keeping representations active, however, is not enough if the task demands maintaining more than one chunk of information. In addition, the components and features of each chunk must be bound together to prevent them from being mixed up. For example, if a red triangle and a green square must be remembered at the same time, one must make sure that "red" is bound to "triangle" and "green" is bound to "square". One way of establishing such bindings is by having the neurons that represent features of the same chunk fire in synchrony, and those that represent features belonging to different chunks fire out of sync. In the example, neurons representing redness would fire in synchrony with neurons representing the triangular shape, but out of sync with those representing the square shape. So far, there is no direct evidence that working memory uses this binding mechanism, and other mechanisms have been proposed as well. It has been speculated that synchronous firing of neurons involved in working memory oscillate with frequencies in the theta band (4 to 8 Hz). Indeed, the power of theta frequency in the EEG increases with working memory load, and oscillations in the theta band measured over different parts of the skull become more coordinated when the person tries to remember the binding between two components of information.

=== Localization in the brain ===
Localization of brain functions in humans has become much easier with the advent of brain imaging methods (PET and fMRI). This research has confirmed that areas in the PFC are involved in working memory functions. During the 1990s much debate had centered on the different functions of the ventrolateral (i.e., lower areas) and the dorsolateral (higher) areas of the PFC. A human lesion study provides additional evidence for the role of the dorsolateral prefrontal cortex in working memory. One view was that the dorsolateral areas are responsible for spatial working memory and the ventrolateral areas for non-spatial working memory. Another view proposed a functional distinction, arguing that ventrolateral areas are mostly involved in pure maintenance of information, whereas dorsolateral areas are more involved in tasks requiring some processing of the memorized material. The debate is not entirely resolved but most of the evidence supports the functional distinction.

Brain imaging has revealed that working memory functions are not limited to the PFC. A review of numerous studies shows areas of activation during working memory tasks scattered over a large part of the cortex. There is a tendency for spatial tasks to recruit more right-hemisphere areas, and for verbal and object working memory to recruit more left-hemisphere areas. The activation during verbal working memory tasks can be broken down into one component reflecting maintenance, in the left posterior parietal cortex, and a component reflecting subvocal rehearsal, in the left frontal cortex (Broca's area, known to be involved in speech production). Studies using biologically constrained neural network models indicate that human-specific cortical connectivity supports robust verbal working memory, distinguishing humans from non-human primates.

There is an emerging consensus that most working memory tasks recruit a network of PFC and parietal areas. A study has shown that during a working memory task the connectivity between these areas increases. Another study has demonstrated that these areas are necessary for working memory, and not simply activated accidentally during working memory tasks, by temporarily blocking them through transcranial magnetic stimulation (TMS), thereby producing an impairment in task performance.

A current debate concerns the function of these brain areas. The PFC has been found to be active in a variety of tasks that require executive functions. This has led some researchers to argue that the role of PFC in working memory is in controlling attention, selecting strategies, and manipulating information in working memory, but not in maintenance of information. The maintenance function is attributed to more posterior areas of the brain, including the parietal cortex. Other authors interpret the activity in parietal cortex as reflecting executive functions, because the same area is also activated in other tasks requiring attention but not memory. Evidence from decoding studying employing multi-voxel-pattern-analysis of fMRI data showed the content of visual working memory can be decoded from activity patterns in visual cortex, but not prefrontal cortex. This led to the suggestion that the maintenance function of visual working memory is performed by visual cortex while the role of the prefrontal cortex is in executive control over working memory though it has been pointed out that such comparisons do not take into account the base rate of decoding across different regions.

A 2003 meta-analysis of 60 neuroimaging studies found left frontal cortex was involved in low-task demand verbal working memory and right frontal cortex for spatial working memory. Brodmann's areas (BAs) 6, 8, and 9, in the superior frontal cortex was involved when working memory must be continuously updated and when memory for temporal order had to be maintained. Right Brodmann 10 and 47 in the ventral frontal cortex were involved more frequently with demand for manipulation such as dual-task requirements or mental operations, and Brodmann 7 in the posterior parietal cortex was also involved in all types of executive function. Updating information in visual working memory is also influenced by the functional neural network connecting different brain regions. The dorsolateral PFC plays a crucial role in this process. In particular, the middle frontal gyrus may be involved in the maintenance, and the frontal operculum in the controlled processing of materials in working memory. Studies have also shown the role of attentional switching in working memory updating, mediated by the superior parietal lobule. Working memory updating also involves a repetition mechanism mediated by the temporal cortex. And in addition, the process of working memory updating involves the sensory cortex to encode and store certain visual stimuli, such as geometric shapes (inferior occipital gyrus) and faces (fusiform gyrus).

Working memory has been suggested to involve two processes with different neuroanatomical locations in the frontal and parietal lobes. First, a selection operation that retrieves the most relevant item, and second an updating operation that changes the focus of attention made upon it. Updating the attentional focus has been found to involve the transient activation in the caudal superior frontal sulcus and posterior parietal cortex, while increasing demands on selection selectively changes activation in the rostral superior frontal sulcus and posterior cingulate/precuneus.

Articulating the differential function of brain regions involved in working memory is dependent on tasks able to distinguish these functions. Most brain imaging studies of working memory have used recognition tasks such as delayed recognition of one or several stimuli, or the n-back task, in which each new stimulus in a long series must be compared to the one presented n steps back in the series. The advantage of recognition tasks is that they require minimal movement (just pressing one of two keys), making fixation of the head in the scanner easier. Experimental research and research on individual differences in working memory, however, has used largely recall tasks (e.g., the reading span task, see below). It is not clear to what degree recognition and recall tasks reflect the same processes and the same capacity limitations.

Brain imaging studies have been conducted with the reading span task or related tasks. Increased activation during these tasks was found in the PFC and, in several studies, also in the anterior cingulate cortex (ACC). People performing better on the task showed larger increase of activation in these areas, and their activation was correlated more over time, suggesting that their neural activity in these two areas was better coordinated, possibly due to stronger connectivity.

=== Neural models ===
One approach to modeling the neurophysiology and the functioning of working memory is prefrontal cortex basal ganglia working memory (PBWM). In this model, the prefrontal cortex works hand-in-hand with the basal ganglia to accomplish the tasks of working memory. Many studies have shown this to be the case. One used ablation techniques in patients who had had seizures and had damage to the prefrontal cortex and basal ganglia. Researchers found that such damage resulted in decreased capacity to carry out the executive function of working memory. Additional research conducted on patients with brain alterations due to methamphetamine use found that training working memory increases volume in the basal ganglia.

=== Effects of stress on neurophysiology ===
Working memory is impaired by acute and chronic psychological stress. This phenomenon was first discovered in animal studies by Arnsten and colleagues, who have shown that stress-induced catecholamine release in PFC rapidly decreases PFC neuronal firing and impairs working memory performance through feedforward, intracellular signaling pathways that open potassium channels to rapidly weaken prefrontal network connections. This process of rapid changes in network strength is called Dynamic Network Connectivity, and can be seen in human brain imaging when cortical functional connectivity rapidly changes in response to a stressor. Exposure to chronic stress leads to more profound working memory deficits and additional architectural changes in PFC, including dendritic atrophy and spine loss, which can be prevented by inhibition of protein kinase C signaling. fMRI research has extended this research to humans, and confirms that reduced working memory caused by acute stress links to reduced activation of the PFC, and stress increased levels of catecholamines. Furthermore, fMRI research has linked trauma with Working Memory degradation through induced emotional stress. Imaging studies of medical students undergoing stressful exams have also shown weakened PFC functional connectivity, consistent with the animal studies. The marked effects of stress on PFC structure and function may help to explain how stress can cause or exacerbate mental illness. The more stress in one's life, the lower the efficiency of working memory in performing simple cognitive tasks. Students who performed exercises that reduced the intrusion of negative thoughts showed an increase in their working memory capacity. Mood states (positive or negative) can have an influence on the neurotransmitter dopamine, which in turn can affect problem-solving.

=== Effects of alcohol on neurophysiology ===
Excessive alcohol use can result in brain damage which impairs working memory. Alcohol has an effect on the blood-oxygen-level-dependent (BOLD) response. The BOLD response correlates increased blood oxygenation with brain activity, which makes this response a useful tool for measuring neuronal activity. The BOLD response affects regions of the brain such as the basal ganglia and thalamus when performing a working memory task. Adolescents who start drinking at a young age show a decreased BOLD response in these brain regions. Alcohol dependent young women in particular exhibit less of a BOLD response in parietal and frontal cortices when performing a spatial working memory task. Binge drinking, specifically, can also affect one's performance on working memory tasks, particularly visual working memory. Additionally, there seems to be a gender difference in regards to how alcohol affects working memory. While women perform better on verbal working memory tasks after consuming alcohol compared to men, they appear to perform worse on spatial working memory tasks as indicated by less brain activity. Finally, age seems to be an additional factor. Older adults are more susceptible than others to the effects of alcohol on working memory.

== Genetics ==
=== Behavioral genetics ===
Individual differences in working-memory capacity are to some extent heritable; that is, about half of the variation between individuals is related to differences in their genes. The genetic component of variability of working-memory capacity is largely shared with that of fluid intelligence.

=== Attempts to identify individual genes ===
Little is known about which genes are related to the functioning of working memory. Within the theoretical framework of the multi-component model, one candidate gene has been proposed, namely ROBO1 for the hypothetical phonological loop component of working memory.

More recently another gene was found regarding working memory. Looking at genetically diverse mice, GPR12 was found in promoting a protein necessary for working memory. When they took mice that were performing worse on memory tests than their control mouse counterparts and increased their GPR12 proteins, those mice improved from 50% to 80%. That brought the low performance mice up to level similar to their control counterparts.

With the build up of prior work on mice such as testing the Formimidoyltransferase Cyclodeaminase (FTCD) gene in regards to the Morris water maze performance, testing out if there was a potential variation of genetic coding within the FTCD gene within humans was soon tested out. Results showed that a variation was found but varied depending on the age of the individual. In regards to the FTCD gene, it appeared that only children were affected by it. Working memory seemed to have a higher performance when the FTCD gene was present but had no similar affect to adults.

== Role in academic achievement ==
Working memory capacity is correlated with learning outcomes in literacy and numeracy. Initial evidence for this relation comes from the correlation between working-memory capacity and reading comprehension, as first observed by Daneman and Carpenter (1980) and confirmed in a later meta-analytic review of several studies. Subsequent work found that working memory performance in primary school children accurately predicted performance in mathematical problem solving. One longitudinal study showed that a child's working memory at 5 years old is a better predictor of academic success than IQ.

In another research they have found that children with low working memory struggle in completing activities, staying focus and remembering instructions in the academic setting. They found that students may seem inattentive or not motivated, but in reality they are experiencing limitations in working memory capacity (Alloway, T.P. 2009).

A randomized controlled study of 580 children in Germany indicated that working memory training at age six had a significant positive effect in spatial working memory immediately after training, and that the effect gradually transferred to other areas, with significant and meaningful increases in reading comprehension, mathematics (geometry), and IQ (measured by Raven matrices). Additionally, a marked increase in ability to inhibit impulses was detected in the follow-up after one year, measured as a higher score in the Go-No Go task. Four years after the treatment, the effects persisted and was captured as a 16 percentage point higher acceptance rate to the academic track (German Gymnasium), as compared to the control group.

In a large-scale screening study, one in ten children in mainstream classrooms were identified with working memory deficits. The majority of them performed very poorly in academic achievements, independent of their IQ. Similarly, working memory deficits have been identified in national curriculum low-achievers as young as seven years of age. Without appropriate intervention, these children lag behind their peers. A recent study of 37 school-age children with significant learning disabilities has shown that working memory capacity at baseline measurement, but not IQ, predicts learning outcomes two years later. This suggests that working memory impairments are associated with low learning outcomes and constitute a high risk factor for educational underachievement for children. In children with learning disabilities such as dyslexia, ADHD, and developmental coordination disorder, a similar pattern is evident.

== Relation to attention ==
There is some evidence that optimal working memory performance links to the neural ability to focus attention on task-relevant information and to ignore distractions, and that practice-related improvement in working memory is due to increasing these abilities. One line of research suggests a link between the working memory capacities of a person and their ability to control the orientation of attention to stimuli in the environment. Such control enables people to attend to information important for their current goals, and to ignore goal-irrelevant stimuli that tend to capture their attention due to their sensory saliency (such as an ambulance siren). The direction of attention according to one's goals is assumed to rely on "top-down" signals from the pre-frontal cortex (PFC) that biases processing in posterior cortical areas. Capture of attention by salient stimuli is assumed to be driven by "bottom-up" signals from subcortical structures and the primary sensory cortices. The ability to override "bottom-up" capture of attention differs between individuals, and this difference has been found to correlate with their performance in a working-memory test for visual information. Another study, however, found no correlation between the ability to override attentional capture and measures of more general working-memory capacity.

== Relationship with neural disorders ==
An impairment of working memory functioning is normally seen in several neural disorders:

=== ADHD ===
Several authors have proposed that symptoms of ADHD arise from a primary deficit in a specific executive function (EF) domain such as working memory, response inhibition or a more general weakness in executive control. A meta-analytical review cites several studies that found significant lower group results for ADHD in spatial and verbal working memory tasks, and in several other EF tasks. However, the authors concluded that EF weaknesses neither are necessary nor sufficient to cause all cases of ADHD.

Several neurotransmitters, such as dopamine and glutamate may be involved in both ADHD and working memory. Both are associated with the frontal brain, self-direction and self-regulation, but cause–effect have not been confirmed, so it is unclear whether working memory dysfunction leads to ADHD, or ADHD distractibility leads to poor functionality of working memory, or if there is some other connection.

=== Parkinson's disease ===
Patients with Parkinson's show signs of a reduced verbal function of working memory. They wanted to find if the reduction is due to a lack of ability to focus on relevant tasks, or a low amount of memory capacity. Twenty-one patients with Parkinson's were tested in comparison to the control group of 28 participants of the same age. The researchers found that both hypotheses were the reason working memory function is reduced which did not fully agree with their hypothesis that it is either one or the other.

=== Alzheimer's disease ===
As Alzheimer's disease becomes more serious, less working memory functions. In addition to deficits in episodic memory, Alzheimer's disease is associated with impairments in visual short-term memory, assessed using delayed reproduction tasks. These investigations point to a deficit in visual feature binding as an important component of the deficit in Alzheimer's disease. There is one study that focuses on the neural connections and fluidity of working memory in mice brains. Half of the mice were given an injection that mimicked the effects of Alzheimer's, and the other half were not. Then the mice were expected to go through a maze that is a task to test working memory. The study helps answer questions about how Alzheimer's can deteriorate the working memory and ultimately obliterate memory functions.

=== Huntington's disease ===
A group of researchers hosted a study that researched the function and connectivity of working memory over a 30-month longitudinal experiment. It found that there were certain places in the brain where most connectivity was decreased in pre-Huntington diseased patients, in comparison to the control group that remained consistently functional.

== Relationship with uncertainty ==
A recent study by Li and colleagues showed evidence that the same brain regions responsible for working memory are also responsible for how much humans trust those memories. In the past, studies have shown that individuals can evaluate how much they trust their own memories, but how humans can do this was largely unknown. Using spatial memory tests and fMRI scans, they processed where and when the information was being stored and used this data to determine memory errors. They also asked the participants to express how uncertain they were about their memories. With both sets of information, the researchers could conclude that memory and the trust in that memory are stored within the same brain region.

== See also ==
- Atkinson–Shiffrin memory model
- Prefrontal cortex § Attention and memory
- Fuzzy-trace theory
- Intermediate-term memory
- Memory and aging
- Prefrontal cortex basal ganglia working memory (PBWM)
- Cognitive architecture
- Tim Shallice
- Working memory (autism)
