= Journal of Media Psychology =

- Discipline: Psychology; Media and Communication
- Language: English
- Edited by: Caleb T. Carr

Publication details
- Former name: Zeitschrift für Medienpsychologie
- History: 1989–present
- Publisher: Hogrefe (Germany)
- Frequency: Bimonthly
- Impact factor: 2.4 (5-year 2.3) (2024)

Standard abbreviations
- ISO 4: J. Media Psychol.

Indexing
- ISSN: 1864-1105 (print); 2151-2388 (web)
- LCCN: 2008248079
- OCLC no.: 237231406

Links
- Journal homepage; Online access; Online archive

The Journal of Media Psychology is a bimonthly peer-reviewed academic journal covering media psychology. It was established in 1989 as the Zeitschrift für Medienpsychologie and obtained its current name in 2008. It is published by Hogrefe. The current editor-in-chief is Caleb T. Carr (Illinois State University).

== Past editors ==
Years	Editor	Institution
2025-Present	Caleb T. Carr	Illinois State University
2021-2025	Nick Bowman	Newhouse School of Public Communications
2018-2020	Christoph Klimmt	Hanover University of Music, Drama, and Media
2015-2017	Nicole Krämer	University Duisburg-Essen
2009-2014	Gary Bente	University of Cologne
2008-2009	Margrit Schreier	University of Cologne
2001-2007	Peter Vorderer	University of Mannheim

The list of editors above is only applicable to the journal as named Journal of Media Psychology. However, in the inaugural issue, Margrit Schreier offered a narrative accounting of the history of JMP prior to rebranding as an English-language journal.

== Abstracting and indexing ==
The journal is abstracted and indexed in Current Contents/Social and Behavioral Sciences, Social Sciences Citation Index, International Bibliography of Periodical Literature, PsycINFO, PsycLIT, and Scopus.
