= Information technology and aging =

A factor to be considered with old age is cognitive aging. Information technologies need to be centered on factors that define cognition. This article highlights some of the important conceptual models and theories that govern the design of such systems. The main focus is to look at the different information processing technologies that are presently used for enabling better functional performance.

As baby boomers grow older, there exists a growing demand for a good support system that can ease their burdens. Technology is ubiquitous in most social contexts in industrialized countries, and has become an integral component of most activities in everyday life. The advent of technology has shown promising results in various fields such as the delivery of care and in-vehicle driving technology by focusing on the needs of older adults and placing them at the center of this transformation. Such systems would improve and empower not just the elderly but also their families while reducing some of the burden on them and increasing independence. However, there continues to exist a digital divide amongst the elderly population that use technology less, causing them to become disenfranchised and disadvantaged.

== Elderly and technology ==
Although older adults are increasingly using technology, they typically have more difficulty than younger adults in learning to use and operate them. The successful adoption and usage of new technology is becoming increasingly important for functional independence in the lives of adults both young and old. Older adults are now more than ever faced with a wide range of new technologies on a daily basis. Thus an important task in the field of gerontology is to develop training tools that can aid and improve accessibility for older adults. What makes this complex is the need for age-specific tools that match the cognitive and perceptual capabilities of this age group.

=== Cognition ===
Age-related differences in cognitive functioning have been known to stem from the reduction of cognitive resources available, thus impairing older adults' ability to carry out cognitively demanding tasks. Cognitive aging causes changes in mechanisms related to information processing and working memory function. According to cognitive psychologist Fergus I. M. Craik, these mechanisms are responsible for age-related speed of decline in performance of mental processing; online cognitive resources available at any given time to process, store, retrieve, and transform information (working memory); focusing on a target; paying attention; and sensory processing of information. The inherent relationship between cognitive abilities and technology adoption points to the importance of ensuring that system interfaces are well designed and easy to use. The use of information processing theory in cognition looks at the role of the three stages of memory related to retrieving, transferring, and recalling information. Cognitive information processing focuses on different aspects of instruction and how those aspects can either facilitate or hinder learning and memory. It emphasizes using strategies that focus the learner's attention, promotes encoding and retrieval, and provide for meaningful, effective practice across learning environments and curriculum.

=== Compensatory technologies ===
Compensatory systems can be used to support cognitive aging and impairment and thereby improve performance. They range from simple home reminder systems to sophisticated robotic support systems. While there are numerous technological interventions at present being developed, there continues to be an increase in the amount of research and work that focuses on providing compensatory support for a number of executive functional impairments for the elderly. Early work on prospective memory aids and assistive devices investigated the application of commonplace technologies which were inexpensive, easy to use, and invoked no social stigma. Due to the inherent limitations of such devices, there was a need to design effective, portable memory aid devices that provide cues and relevant information. Listed below are some of the information technologies that have been developed:

Device	Description
IQ Voice Organizer	A pocket-sized device that allows verbal messages to be recorded and played back audibly at any time
Data Link Watch	A system that consists of a wristwatch and a software program for a PC that stores the user's schedule and important medical information that can send reminders to the user
Cell Minder	Tracks users' schedules and sends reminders by calling them on their cell phone
Memory Aiding Prompting Maps (MAPS)	Communicates user information with caregivers and clinicians to record users' schedule and automatically contact doctors if problems arise
Task Guidance System	Can be programmed and customized to guide users' tasks through prompts; for users with severe cognitive impairments

The future of information technology lies in creating context-dependent devices that respond to the user's physical and social environment. For example, if the device was aware of the user's location, it could give reminders relevant to that location. Information about the user's environment might also provide clues to the device on what reminders might be important or unnecessary. Social cues might allow the device to know when a reminder would be inappropriate, such as when the user is talking with another person and might not want to be interrupted.

== Information processing theory ==
Information processing theory is an approach used to study cognitive development that evolved out of the American experimental tradition in psychology. Developmental psychologists who adopt the information-processing perspective account for mental development in terms of maturational changes in basic components of a child's mind. The theory is based on the idea that humans process the information they receive, rather than merely responding to stimuli. This perspective equates the mind to a computer, which is responsible for analyzing information from the environment. According to the standard information-processing model for mental development, the mind's machinery includes attention mechanisms for bringing information in, working memory for actively manipulating information, and long-term memory for passively holding information so that it can be used in the future. A primary focus of information processing is memory.

=== Stage theory ===
The most widely accepted model is called "stage theory" based on the work by Richard Atkinson and Richard Shiffrin shown in figure 1. The model focuses on how information is stored in the memory in three stages. In this theory, information is thought to be processed in a serial, discontinuous manner as it moves from one stage to another.

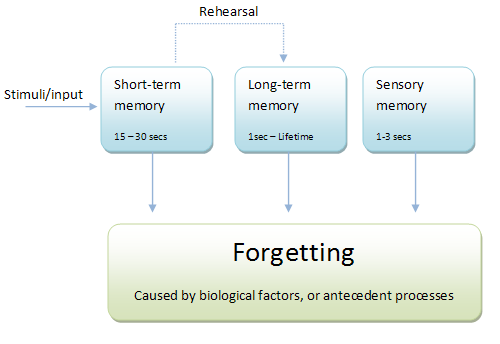
Figure1: Stage Theory

=== Other theories ===
There are many recent theories concerning information processing that differ from the stage theory model. Research and study continue to modify existing beliefs in cognitive psychology. Despite the fact that there are commonly accepted pieces, the complete picture of how information is processed continues to change.

Levels of processing: One of the first alternatives to the stage theory was developed by Fergus I. M. Craik and Robert S. Lockhart (1972). The levels of processing theory holds that memory is not three-staged, which distinguishes it from the stage theory model.

Dual-coding theory: Another theory is Allan Paivio's work in dual coding. This theory gives equal significance to both verbal and non-verbal processing and suggests that there are two separate systems for processing these types of information.

Schema theory, parallel distributed processing, and connectionist models: David Rumelhart (1980), working in conjunction with others, developed the schema theory of information processing and memory. He suggested that a schema is a data structure for representing generic concepts stored in memory.
