= Transfer-appropriate processing =

Transfer-appropriate processing (TAP) is a type of state-dependent memory specifically showing that memory performance is not only determined by the depth of processing (where associating meaning with information strengthens memory; see levels-of-processing effect), but by the relationship between how information is initially encoded and how it is later retrieved.

== Further explanation ==
Memory will be best when the processes engaged in during encoding match those engaged in during retrieval. Transfer-appropriate processing (TAP) argues that to have memory successfully recalled there needs to be a successful encoding process. There has been an argument among cognitive psychologists that suggests that the encoding process and retrieval processes are substantially similar. In an experiment that tested TAP researchers found this argument to be true. They found that successful memory retrieval backs up the encoding process, which therefore has a similar effect on both the retrieval and encoding function. This experiment also pointed out that there are certain variables to consider when looking at TAP because they greatly limit the effectiveness of the retrieval and encoding processes. They believed that to change TAP into a broader form, you would have to question whether the two processing forms actually coincide. Also, TAP is an information-processing action that occurs in two stages; the first includes the procedures that should manipulate the information that coincides with the task activity, and the second stage focuses on the experience that the task activity created. Meaning, that we do not process stimuli all at one time, but instead break it down into a series of responses.

== History: the beginnings ==
In 1972, Fergus I. M. Craik and Robert S. Lockhart completed studies that went against the idea of multistore theories and were in favor of levels of processing when it comes to the human memory. Craik and Lockhart's studies were some of the first studies completed dealing with Transfer-Appropriate Processing, which is now popular because of their ideas. Craik and Lockhart explained that the theory of multistore had very little evidence when it came to capacity, coding and retention. Instead, they proposed that memory involves level of processing. They concluded that we are always building from what we already know through our senses, patterns, and stimulus. Craik and Lockhart completed 10 experiments where participants processed different words by answering questions about them. Depending on the word, the response could be shallow or deep. After this section of the experiment was complete, participants were asked to randomly recall words. They were able to conclude that participants remembered positive and deeper responses more easily. Next, Craik continued his work with Endel Tulving in 1975. They tested subjects individually for perception and speed. Participants had a word revealed to them for 200 ms. through a tachistoscope. Before exposure, questions were asked about the word. These questions were meant to create shallow or deep reactions about the words for the participants. After this was complete, the participants were then asked questions about the words. After these random questions, the participants were asked to recall the words. It was assumed that deeper level questions would be recalled more often. Through four separate experiments, Craik and Tulving found this to be true.

== Experiments ==
This phenomenon has been shown by various experiments:

- One example of this is empirically shown, specifically, in a study by Morris and associates (1977) using semantic and rhyme tasks. In a standard recognition test, memory was better following semantic processing compared to rhyme processing (the levels-of-processing effect). However, in a rhyming recognition test, memory was better for those who engaged in rhyme processing compared to semantic processing.
- Another experiment done by Haline E. Schendan and Marta Kutas present the neurophysiological evidence for transfer appropriate processing. They verified that memory is best recalled when the situations are very similar to one another. In this experiment two different studies were done. The event-related brain potentials (ERPs) were recorded as a means for information during a memory test. According to this specific study as well as other transfer-appropriate processing accounts, there will be significantly more memory recalled when things are continually grouped together on a perceptual level. Kutas and Schendan showed that there is neurophysiological evidence that if the correct transfer processing of study takes place, then the test experiences will show a difference in memory reactivation. This will occur even if there are some small visual differences within the setting.
- One experiment done by Patricia A. deWinstanley and Elizabeth Ligon Bjork also shows evidence for transfer appropriate processing. Two different tests were done within this experiment and their objective was to prove multifactor transfer appropriate processing of generation effects. Within this experiment they also focused on the fact that not all of our processing is compatible with one another, and they also hypothesized that comprehending and reading are different in regards to where the individuals' resources are used in the act of processing. The results showed new and truthful evidence for the multifactor transfer appropriate processing model. They also proved the limited processing assumption mentioned earlier; in which states that our processing of one type of information is not always compatible with a differing type of information. This was shown in the cued-recall test in Experiment 2. Once we switch to another information type, our processing may become slow or even stopped. However, when processing the same type of information, our comprehension can increase.
- Another great experiment done with transfer appropriate processing was one by Michael E. Stiso. It dealt with the role of TAP (transfer-appropriate processing) in the effectiveness of decision-support graphics. The tasks that were presented during the experiment were relatable to real-world tasks done by people each day. The individuals were placed into an air traffic control simulator. During some of the trials, they had decision-support graphics to show things that normally are processed cognitively, such as altitude. The hypothesis behind this experiment is that the individual will process information completely differently when these graphics are present versus when they aren't present. Also, the individual's performance should be the best when they are either shown the graphics during all of their trials or when they aren't shown them at all. It is predicted that the precipitants will perform the worst when they are shown the graphics in some of the trials but not in others. Within this experiment, the thought behind transfer-appropriate processing is that one's ability to remember depends on the length of the overlap in differing types of processing. If an individual has a great amount of overlap in processing, then memory will most likely be greater.
- Finally, an experiment that shows the effects of Transfer-appropriate Processing is one done by Jeffery J, Franks, Carol W. Bilbrey, Khoo Guatlien, and Timothy P, McNamara. Once again, TAP is interconnected with memory. In this specific study, transfer-appropriate processing is analyzed with its effects on first and second exposure to various items, and it is shown throughout 13 experiments. The idea that individuals will perform better on tasks that they have had previous exposure to is one of the main forums behind TAP.

== Problems ==
Although this theory has many experiments backing up its reliability, many researchers are questioning the levels of processing that TAP seems to fall into. The levels of processing have been under speculation for the fact that they seem untestable and unfalsifiable. They argue that these processing effects are "circular" in the sense that deep processing can be considered as just better remembering. They believe that much of the questionability of the processing effects lies between the encoding specificity principle and TAP. The researchers argue that these processing systems function much like Darwin's natural selection theory in that the "fitness" of a species and the "depth of processing" in the levels of processing cannot fully predict the final outcome, meaning the survival and retrievability of the species or the information processed. They have found that TAP is still vulnerable to this same type of circularity because it lacks a precise and definite definition. Basically, TAP can only be identified as happening only AFTER retrieval has occurred. Roediger and Gallo argue that after 30 years of research, they still cannot identify why or how we get the typical levels-of-processing effect. However, they still believe that even with these doubts that memory retrieval can be studied and subjected to experiments with "specified" retrieval conditions. Therefore, the levels-of-processing effect that TAP falls under supports that the "greater survival" of deep processing most likely occurs, which means that if they had any doubts about transfer-appropriate processing, they should consider the fact that retrieval has more of a range than a semantic processing theory would support, and more than likely thrive and survive.

== Examples ==
An example of TAP can be compared to the theory of natural selection presented by Darwin in the section above. This means that if a certain species is "fitter" than the other species, then that fitter species is more likely to continue to adapt to future environmental situations. Lockhart, who refers to this phenomenon, suggests that if a rabbit and a koala were compared that a rabbit would thrive and survive in many environments whereas the koala has worked itself into a "narrow ecological niche". This means the rabbit would excel at surviving because it has a wider range of flexible qualities. Of course it could be argued that there would be certain areas that the koala would thrive in, but they are not as numerous as the survival qualities of the rabbit.
