= Fergus I. M. Craik =

Scottish researcher and cognitive psychologist

Fergus Craik
- Born: Fergus Ian Muirden Craik; 17 April 1935 (age 91); Edinburgh, Scotland
- Education: University of Edinburgh; University of Liverpool
- Known for: Levels-of-processing effect
- Scientific career
- Workplaces: University of Toronto (1971–2000), Baycrest’s Rotman Research Institute (presently)
- Thesis: Age differences in confidence and decision processes (1965)
- Doctoral students: Nicole Anderson

Fergus Ian Muirden Craik FRS (born 17 April 1935, Edinburgh, Scotland) is a cognitive psychologist known for his research on levels of processing in memory. This work was done in collaboration with Robert Lockhart at the University of Toronto in 1972 and continued with another collaborative effort with Endel Tulving in 1975. Craik has received numerous awards and is considered a leader in the area of memory, attention and cognitive aging. Moreover, his work over the years can be seen in developmental psychology, aging and memory, and the neuropsychology of memory.

He studied at the University of Edinburgh and gained his bachelor of science in psychology in 1960. In 1965, he received his PhD from the University of Liverpool. He began his academic career at Birkbeck College, and then moved to Toronto, Ontario, Canada to pursue an academic career at the University of Toronto in 1971. Currently, he is a Senior Scientist at the Rotman Research Institute in Toronto. In recent times, he was elected a Fellow of the Royal Society in 2008.

== Early life ==
Craik was born in Edinburgh, Scotland, as the eldest of three siblings. A year and a half into his life, his family relocated to the small market-town of Lockerbie, Scotland. His initial career aspiration was to be a minister or a carpenter. He attended Lockerbie Academy throughout his childhood and his parents enrolled him in George Watson's Boys’ College, in Edinburgh, at age 12.

His parents’ decision to send him to a high-ranking high school enabled Craik to discover his strengths. He excelled in physics, english, and biological sciences which helped change his career aspirations upon graduating high school.

During his time at the University of Edinburgh, Craik met his wife, Anne, through a study for his undergraduate thesis. Together, they raised two children: Lindsay (born 1963) and Neil (born 1965).

== Education and academic career ==
Craik's introduction to psychology stemmed from his dissatisfaction in medical school. While he found neurology, physiology, and psychiatry interesting, anatomical catalogues were challenging and tiresome and the company of sick patients were not of his interest. While completing his final undergraduate year in psychology, Craik was introduced to experimental psychology. He completed his undergraduate thesis on the effect of rate of information processing on time perception, a topic that was heavily influenced by George Miller and his workings. His time at the University of Edinburgh also facilitated his exposure to theoretical psychology. Some of the courses he took allowed Craik to read the works of Donald Hebb, Dalbir Bindra, James J. Gibson, and some ethologists while another course introduced him to memory and learning. By the time Craik was ready to graduate with his bachelor of science, he began to realize his interests were in attention and perception. He graduated in 1960.

In 1960, Craik was offered a position at the Medical Research Council in London, England, to study how aging occurs. This job allowed Craik to make connections with the Department of Psychology at the University of Liverpool in which he was accepted for graduate studies. During his time working for the MRC, Craik investigated age-related changes in confidence and decision-making abilities. While working here, Craik was also able to gain exposure to on-going research in other MRC-based branches. One of the researchers he found most profound was Donald Broadbent, thus, Craik was able to approach psychologists of interest to him and develop his interests in psychology. The work that he completed throughout this tenure here formed the basis of his Ph.D. dissertation, however, Craik's interests became more cognitive-based. Following his graduation in 1965, the appeal of emerging cognitive psychological views became a newfound interest.

Later in 1965, Craik accepted his first faculty position at Birkbeck College over the following six years. During this time, his research focus shifted entirely to memory processes. Peter Venables, a research professor at the same institution, was simultaneously conducting research on the neurophysiology of schizophrenia and influenced Craik's interests via processing deficits in the human mind. It is here that neuropsychology begins to reform Craik's research.

Following a NATO-sponsored meeting on memory in 1967, Craik was offered the opportunity to act as a visiting professor at the University of Toronto by fellow attendee and prominent psychologist, Endel Tulving. He completed this opportunity during 1968–1969. As an abundance of memory-based research was being conducted by Endel Tulving and his colleagues at the University of Toronto, Craik and his family permanently relocated to Toronto in 1971.

At the University of Toronto, Craik worked as an association professor of psychology at the Erindale campus in 1971 and eventually the St. George campus. At this time, Anne Treisman’s research from the 1960s influenced Craik as the concept of levels of perception formed the basis of her theory of attention. Craik felt that memory must incorporate a series of analyses as well that range from shallow to deep, with the varying depths of encoding representing different levels of memory processing. Together, with Robert Lockhart, Craik co-wrote an article on the levels-of-processing that rivaled the previously accepted Atkinson-Shiffrin memory model at the time. This article changed what was previously thought on how memory is processed and stored in the human mind and gained support as the new paradigm for memory processing. A follow-up article was done by Craik and Tulving in 1975 which provided more evidence for this new model through a series of experiments.

As Craik’s research endeavors explored memory processing, he began to incorporate aging into his research during the 1980s. Craik also involved himself in editorial boards for journals and visited other psychology departments and institutions in North America.

With the invention of functional neuroimaging and the University of Toronto’s acquisition of a PET scanner, Craik and many of his colleagues looked at the brain correlates involved in encoding and retrieving processes in memory. A large portion of this research was possible because of the conception of the Rotman Research Institute at the Baycrest Centre for Geriatric Care in northern Toronto – an institution that Craik helped conceive.

In June 2000, he retired from the University of Toronto and gained emeritus status. He is currently continuing to pursue his research interests as a senior scientist at the Rotman Research Institute, investigating various linkages between memory, attention, and cognitive aging.

== Research ==
=== Levels-of-Processing Paradigm ===
The most well-known and notable of Craiks’ research analyzed how memory is encoded and various levels of depths of processing. Craik and Lockhart postulated that during the first stage of memory where information is acquired, the encoding stage, there is a series of processing hierarchies. During the initial phase of encoding, an individual experiences "shallow" processing and may reach into the deepest level. Memory traces form as a result of these processes, containing coding characteristics and persistence in memory. A deeper depth of processing implies that a greater amount of semantic or cognitive analysis must be conducted. Therefore, a stimulus that has undergone a deep level of processing will have a longer, more durable storage and retention.

The controversy this paradigm caused at the time, when compared to the Atkinson-Shiffrin memory model, was that it proposed that memory is not a uniform process that consists of storing information between short-term memory and long-term memory. To break away from the linearity the models possessed at the time, the levels-of-processing adopted a non-structured approach that also infused the different types of memory and associated complexities (i.e. episodic, procedural, and semantic memory). Moreover, Craik and Lockhart's final criticism proposed that there is no separate, capacity-limited, short-term memory store. They think that short-term memory is a temporary activation of the regions of the brain that are involved in long-term memory.

=== Brain Correlates and Memory ===
With the use of functional imaging, in recent times, Craik is looking at how encoding and processing tasks in memory is activated in the brain.

Multiple studies have now shown that deep semantic processing, the most beneficial type of processing, is associated with neural activity in the ventral regions within the left prefrontal cortex. The role of the prefrontal cortex shows that deeper-level encoding is self-generated and strategic process that would not be able to progress without this highly developed region. In the case of retrieval, bilateral prefrontal activation is used instead of just one side. Craik's research also highlighted posterior cortical regions as the area responsible for lower level processing.

=== Age-Related Memory Changes ===
The ways in which memory changes over the adult lifespan is also a source for Craik's latest research. In this case, age is looked at as a factor that alters and degrades memory efficiency and abilities over time. Age-related memory problems become more persistent in the elderly years, and one's ability to recall previously encoded stimuli without cues or context is no longer optimal. However, verbal or visual stimuli can be recognized at the same level of efficiency over the course of a lifetime. Craik and his colleagues found physiological evidence for this cognitive degradation through their research into the brains of elderly participants. Specifically, they discovered that there is a reduction in frontal activity. Still, there is an increased level of activity in the left prefrontal cortex when older adults undergo some nonverbal tasks of retrieval when compared to younger individuals. Moreover, the presence of increased left prefrontal cortex activity is only found in tasks revolving retrieval but there is still a reduction when performing encoding tasks.

It is currently hypothesized that these higher outputs of activity may be necessary for older people to perform sufficiently.

Age-related memory changes are also observed under the influence of physical activity and long-last mental activities such as Sudoku or lifelong bilingualism. These associations are currently being documented to better understand these effects in a systematic manner and delve into the brain and neural correlates associated with these variations.

== Awards and distinctions ==
- Fellow of the Royal Society of Canada
- Fellow of the Royal Society (UK)
- Fellow of the Canadian Psychological Association
- Fellow of the American Psychological Association
- Fellow of the Society of Experimental Psychology
- Killam Research Fellowship (1982)
- Guggenheim Fellowship (1982)
- Distinguished Contribution to Psychology as a Science award (1987) from the CPA
- William James Fellow Award (1991) from the APA
- Honorary President of the CPA (1997)
- Glassman Chair in Neuropsychology at the University of Toronto and Baycrest Centre (1996–2000)
- Hebb Award from the Canadian Society for Brain, Behaviour, and Cognitive Science (1998)
- Killam Prize for Science (2000)
- Dr honoris causa, Université de Bordeaux, France (2006)
- Dr honoris causa, Saarland University, Germany (2013)
