= Nicole Anderson (disambiguation) =

Nicole Gale Anderson is an Australian actress.

Nicole Anderson may also refer to:

- Nicole Anderson (psychologist) (born 1966)
- Nicole Anderson (philosopher)
- Nicol Anderson (1882–1953), Anglican priest
