= Hippocampal memory encoding and retrieval =

The hippocampus participates in the encoding, consolidation, and retrieval of memories. The hippocampus is located in the medial temporal lobe (subcortical), and is an infolding of the medial temporal cortex. The hippocampus plays an important role in the transfer of information from short-term memory to long-term memory during encoding and retrieval stages. These stages do not need to occur successively, but are, as studies seem to indicate, and they are broadly divided in the neuronal mechanisms that they require or even in the hippocampal areas that they seem to activate. According to Gazzaniga, "encoding is the processing of incoming information that creates memory traces to be stored." There are two steps to the encoding process: "acquisition" and "consolidation". During the acquisition process, stimuli are committed to short term memory. Then, consolidation is where the hippocampus along with other cortical structures stabilize an object within long term memory, which strengthens over time, and is a process for which a number of theories have arisen to explain the underlying mechanism. After encoding, the hippocampus is capable of going through the retrieval process. The retrieval process consists of accessing stored information; this allows learned behaviors to experience conscious depiction and execution. Encoding and retrieval are both affected by neurodegenerative and anxiety disorders and epilepsy.

== Theories and reasoning ==
=== HIPER (hippocampal encoding/retrieval) model ===
Meta-positron emission tomography (PET) analysis has lent support toward a division of the hippocampus between caudal and rostral regions. Scans have demonstrated a uniform variation in blood flow distribution within the hippocampus (and the medial temporal lobe broadly) during the separate processes of episodic encoding and retrieval. In the hippocampal encoding/retrieval (HIPER) model, episodic encoding is found to take place within the rostral region of the hippocampus whereas retrieval takes place in the caudal region. However, the divide between these regions need not be disjoint, as functional magnetic resonance imaging (fMRI) data has demonstrated encoding processes occurring within the caudal region.

HIPER is a model resulting from and therefore a reflection of certain experimental phenomena, but cannot completely explain hippocampal encoding and retrieval on its own. Nevertheless, the model suggests a broad division of labor in encoding and retrieval, whether they involve separate regions of the hippocampus or act simultaneously or independently within a single, more inclusive process.

=== Theta phase separation ===
In a framework first developed by Hasselmo and colleagues, theta phase separation implies that the hippocampal theta rhythm occurs in cycles and various phases of the rhythm entail encoding and retrieval as separate processes. An extra-hippocampal structure, the septum, initiates and regulates the theta rhythm and its associated memory processes. GABAergic activity within the septum inhibits certain classes of CA3 cells (a region of the hippocampus), the divide often drawn between basket cells, pyramidal cells, and interneurons, to distinguish encoding from retrieval mechanisms. The study emphasizes and models the CA3 subfield of the hippocampus as a primary inducement towards encoding and retrieval. Encoding as a procedure begins when septal GABAergic inhibition is at minimum, freeing basket cells to act within CA3, and during brief dis-inhibition periods, other cells receive input: a proximal entorhinal input toward pyramidal cells and a coincident dentate gyrus input toward interneurons. On the other hand, retrieval as a procedure begins when septal GABAergic inhibition is at maximum, occluding basket cell activity and enabling pyramidal cells to signal. During this period, Oriens- Lacunosum Moleculare (O-LM) cells disambiguate memory for retrieval.

CA3 is significant as it allows auto-associative processes through a recurrent, collateral system. The theta phase separation model agrees generally with others on the significance of CA3 but is the first to attribute both the processes of encoding and retrieval to the subfield.

=== Reconsolidation hypothesis ===
The reconsolidation hypothesis claims that objects encoded into long term memory experience a new period of consolidation, or the time and resource expended to stabilize a memory object, upon each recollection. This is in opposition to the classical consolidation hypothesis which regards consolidation as a one-time event, following the first encoding of a memory. A memory item in this hypothesis, upon reactivation, destabilizes for a brief period and thereafter invokes the neuronal processes requisite for stabilization.

The reconsolidation hypothesis has lingered since the 1960s; however, a 2000 study, entitled "Fear memories require protein synthesis in the amygdala for reconsolidation after retrieval", examining fear conditioning in rats, has provided evidence in its favor. After receiving post-retrieval an intra-amygdalar infusion of a known amnesic agent, anisomycin, rats failed to recall a rapidly learned fear memory. Hippocampal lesions formed post-retrieval affected the rats' fear conditioning in a similar manner.

The reconsolidation hypothesis does not suppose that subsequent and precedent consolidation phases are necessarily identical in duration or in the neural mechanisms involved. Nevertheless, the commonality that exists in every consolidation phase is a short-lived destabilization of a memory object and a susceptibility for said object to react to amnesic agents—principally protein synthesis inhibitors. Morris and colleagues' experiment indicates that the reconsolidation hypothesis could apply to particular memory types such as allocentric spatial memory, which is either acquired slowly or rapidly. As implied by the authors, however, such an application is feasible only in the case of rapidly acquired spatial memory, the degree to which is influenced by how thoroughly a spatial object is trained.

== Hippocampal disorders that affect encoding and retrieval ==
=== Psychiatric disorders ===
Individuals who develop hippocampal lesions often fare poorly on measures of verbal declarative memory. Tests involving the recall of paragraphs or strings of words, as cited by Bremner and colleagues, illustrate a degree of dysfunction among lesion patients proportionate to the percentage of hippocampal volume and the amount of cells lost.

As precursors toward later studies that would showcase the effect of post-traumatic stress disorder (PTSD) on the human hippocampus, animal studies have broadly demonstrated a susceptibility of the mammalian hippocampus to stressors. In particular, stressed animals develop functional deficits in memory, changes in hippocampal form, and an impairment in neurogenesis, or the ability to produce new neurons.

Bremner and colleagues implemented MRI and PET neuroimaging to measure structure and function respectively and demonstrated a lower average hippocampal volume and activation among women with PTSD. The participants of the study included a population of women who had or had not experienced childhood sexual abuse, a certain subset among which developed PTSD. PET and MRI analysis indicated a 16% lower mean hippocampal volume among abused women who developed PTSD and a 19% lower mean hippocampal volume than all other populations in the experiment.

=== Epilepsy ===
The effect of seizures on memory are often categorized with respect to their intensity and the cortical areas they affect. Epileptic patients, especially those who suffer from temporal lobe epilepsy, often experience deficits in memory encoding and retrieval, developing anterograde and retrograde amnesia. At times, if a seizure specifically affects the hippocampus, the individual afflicted can encode memory; however, that memory rapidly extinguishes.

Accompanying the onset of epilepsies is hippocampal sclerosis, also known as Ammon's horn sclerosis. Individuals afflicted suffer unilateral volume loss, as evidenced by MRI scans. Hippocampal sclerosis involves neural loss and a selective mesial temporal sclerosis (MTS) danger and is likely caused by an overactivation of N-methyl-D-aspartate (NMDA) and α-amino-3-hydroxy-5-methyl-4-isoxazolepropionic acid (AMPA) receptors by the surplus signaling of excitatory neurotransmitters. The depolarization and calcium overload experienced by overactive receptors signal the expression of cell death pathways.

=== Disease ===
According to the Journal of Neurology, Neurosurgery, and Psychiatry, Alzheimer's generally causes a reduction in tissue as well as neurodegeneration throughout the brain. Out of all areas in the brain, the hippocampus is among the first to be damaged by Alzheimer's. One study located in the Journal of Neurology, Neurosurgery, and Psychiatry tested to see the volume changes of the hippocampus in Alzheimer's disease patients. Results showed that there was 27% less volume in the hippocampus compared with the hippocampus found in normal cognition. Lastly, the difference between the hippocampus of an Alzheimer's patient and that of a normal patient was shown through the notable loss seen in cortical grey matter in Alzheimer's.

== Experiment ==
=== Methods ===
In an experiment performed by Zeineh and colleagues, ten subjects were scanned by fMRI while engaged in a face-name associative task that linked a sequence of faces unknown to the participants with the names of the individuals to whom they belonged. The hippocampus is known to play a role in the encoding of memory that associates between a face and a name. The experiment began by dividing encoding blocks, in which the participants viewed and attempted to memorize the faces paired with the names, from retrieval blocks, in which the participants were shown only the faces and asked to match them with their names. This process was completed four times. Rote rehearsal was discouraged by a distractive task administered between encoding and recall blocks.

=== Results ===
The results of Zeineh and colleagues' experiment suggest that encoding and retrieval activate different regions of the hippocampus. As indicated by the authors, a study of hippocampal activity as it pertains to learning and practice has unveiled some of the cortical processes of information acquisition.
