= Levels of processing model =

Psychological model of memory

The levels of processing model, created by Fergus I. M. Craik and Robert S. Lockhart in 1972, describes memory recall of stimuli as a function of the depth of mental processing, where deeper levels of processing produce more elaborate and stronger memory than more shallow levels of processing. Shallow processing (e.g., processing based on phonemic and orthographic components) leads to a fragile memory trace that is susceptible to rapid decay. Conversely, deep processing (e.g., semantic processing) results in a more durable memory trace. There are three levels of processing in this model. Structural or visual processing involves remembering only the physical quality of the word (e.g. how the word is spelled and how letters look). Phonemic processing includes remembering the word by the way it sounds (e.g. the word tall rhymes with fall). Lastly, in semantic processing, individuals encode the meaning of the word with another word that is similar or has similar meaning. Once the word is perceived, the brain allows for a deeper processing.

This theory contradicts the multi-store Atkinson-Shiffrin memory model which represents memory strength as being continuously variable, the assumption being that rehearsal always improves long-term memory. They argued that rehearsal that consists simply of repeating previous analyses (maintenance rehearsal) does not enhance long-term memory.

In a study from 1975 (Craik and Tulving) participants were given a list of 60 words. Each word was presented along with three questions. The participant had to answer one of them. Those three questions were in one of three categories. One category of questions was about how the word was presented visually ("Is the word shown in italics?"). The second category of questions was about the phonemic qualities of the word ("Does the word begin with the sound 'bee'?"). The third category of questions was presented so that the reader was forced to think about the word within a certain context. ("Can you meet one in the street [a friend]"?) The result of this study showed that the words which contained deep processing (the latter) were remembered better.

== Modifiers ==
Familiarity, transfer-appropriate processing, the self-reference effect, and the explicit nature of a stimulus modify the levels-of-processing effect by manipulating mental processing depth factors.

=== Familiarity ===
A stimulus will have a higher recall value if it is highly compatible with preexisting semantic structures (Craik, 1972). According to semantic network theories, this is because such a stimulus will have many connections to other encoded memories, which are activated based on closeness in semantic network structure. This activation increases cognitive analysis, increasing the strength of the memory representation. The familiarity modifier has been tested in implicit memory experiments, where subjects report false memories when presented with related stimuli.

=== Specificity of processing ===
Specificity of processing describes the increased recall value of a stimulus when presented in the method with which it was inputted. For example, auditory stimuli (spoken words and sounds) have the highest recall value when spoken, and visual stimuli have the highest recall value when a subject is presented with images. In writing tasks, words are recalled most effectively with semantic cues (asking for words with a particular meaning) if they are encoded semantically (self-generated by the subject as being related to a particular meaning). Words are recalled most effectively with data-driven cues (word completion) if they are read, rather than generated by a subject.

=== Self-reference effect ===
Levels of processing have been an integral part of learning about memory. The self-reference effect describes the greater recall capacity for a particular stimulus if it is related semantically to the subject. This can be thought of as a corollary of the familiarity modifier, because stimuli specifically related to an event in a person's life will have widespread activation in that person's semantic network. For example, the recall value of a personality trait adjective is higher when subjects are asked whether the trait adjective applies to them than when asked whether trait adjective has a meaning similar to another trait.

=== Implicit memory and levels-of-processing ===
Implicit memory tests, in contrast with explicit memory tests, measure the recall value of a particular stimulus based on later performance on stimulus-related tasks. During these tasks, the subject does not explicitly recall the stimulus, but the previous stimulus still affects performance. For example, in a word-completion implicit memory task, if a subject reads a list containing the word "dog", the subject provides this word more readily when asked for three-letter words beginning in "d". The levels-of-processing effect is only found for explicit memory tests. One study found that word completion tasks were unaffected by levels of semantic encodings achieved using three words with various levels of meaning in common. Another found that typical level-of-processing effects are reversed in word completion tasks; subjects recalled pictures pairs more completely if they were shown a word representing a picture rather than asked to rate a picture for pleasantness (semantic encoding). Typical level-of-processing theory would predict that picture encodings would create deeper processing than lexical encoding.

"Memory over the short term and the long term has been thought to differ in many ways in terms of capacity, the underlying neural substrates, and the types of processes that support performance."

==== Long-term memory ====
We especially remember information if we relate it to ourselves. Damage to the hippocampus produces an inability to form or retrieve new long-term memories, but the ability to maintain and reproduce a small subset of information over the short term is typically preserved.

== Sensory modes ==
Different sensory modes, by their nature, involve different depths of processing, generally producing higher recall value in certain senses than others. However, there is significant room for the modifiers mentioned earlier to affect levels-of-processing to be activated within each sensory mode.

=== Vision ===
Visual input creates the strongest recall value of all senses, and also allows the widest spectrum of levels-of-processing modifiers. It is also one of the most widely studied. Within visual studies, pictures have been shown to have a greater recall value than words – the picture superiority effect. However, semantic associations have the reverse effect in picture memories appear to be reversed to those in other memories. When logical details are stressed, rather than physical details, an image's recall value becomes lower. When comparing orthographic (capitalization, letter and word shape), phonological (word sound) and semantic (word meaning) encoding cues, the highest levels of recall were found with the meanings of the words, followed by their sounds and finally the written and shape-based cues were found to generate the least ability to stimulate recall.

=== Hearing ===
Auditory stimuli follow conventional levels-of-processing rules, although are somewhat weaker in general recall value when compared with vision. Some studies suggest that auditory weakness is only present for explicit memory (direct recall), rather than implicit memory. When test subjects are presented with auditory versus visual word cues, they only perform worse on directed recall of a spoken word versus a seen word, and perform about equally on implicit free-association tests. Within auditory stimuli, semantic analysis produces the highest levels of recall ability for stimuli. Experiments suggest that levels-of-processing on the auditory level is directly correlated with neural activation.

=== Touch ===
Tactile memory representations are similar in nature to visual representations, although there is not enough data to reliably compare the strength of the two kinds of stimuli. One study suggests that there is a difference in mental processing level due to innate differences between visual and tactile stimuli representations. In this study, subjects were presented with an object in both visual and tactile form (a subject is shown a sphere but cannot touch it, and later is given a similar sphere to only hold and not view). Subjects had more trouble identifying size difference in visual fields than using tactile feedback. A suggestion for the lower level of size processing in visual fields is that it results from the high variance in viewed object size due to perspective and distance.

=== Smell ===
Odor memory is weaker than visual memory, achieving a successful identification rate of only 70-80% of visual memory. Levels-of-processing effects have been found within odor memory if subjects are asked to "visualize" smells and associate them with a particular picture. Subjects who perform this task have a different recall value on explicit memory tests than subjects who memorize smells using self-chosen methods. The difference in recall value, however, depends on the subject, and the subject's ability to form images from odors. Attributing verbal attributes to odors has similar effects. Semantic processing of odors (e.g. attributing the "mud" odor to "smell like a puddle") has found to have the most positive effects on recall.

== Neural evidence ==
Several brain imaging studies using positron emission tomography and functional magnetic resonance imaging techniques have shown that higher levels of processing correlate with more brain activity and activity in different parts of the brain than lower levels. For example, in a lexical analysis task, subjects showed activity in the left inferior prefrontal cortex only when identifying whether the word represented a living or nonliving object, and not when identifying whether or not the word contained an "a". Similarly, an auditory analysis task showed increased activation in the left inferior prefrontal cortex when subjects performed increasingly semantic word manipulations. Synaptic aspects of word recognition have been correlated with the left frontal operculum and the cortex lining the junction of the inferior frontal and inferior precentral sulcus. The self-reference effect also has neural correlates with a region of the medial prefrontal cortex, which was activated in an experiment where subjects analyzed the relevance of data to themselves. Specificity of processing is explained on a neurological basis by studies that show brain activity in the same location when a visual memory is encoded and retrieved, and lexical memory in a different location. Visual memory areas were mostly located within the bilateral extrastriate visual cortex.

== Mental disorders ==
Levels-of-processing effects interact in various ways with mental disorders. In particular, levels-of-processing effects appear to be strengthened in patients with age-related memory degradation, selectively strengthened in panic disorder patients, unaffected in Alzheimer's disease patients, and reversed in autistic patients.

=== Age-related memory degradation ===
Memory encoding strength derived from higher levels-of-processing appears to be conserved despite other losses in memory function with age. Several studies show that, in older individuals, the ability to process semantically in contrast with non-semantically is improved by this disparity. Neural imaging studies show decreased left-prefrontal cortex activity when words and images are presented to older subjects than with younger subjects, but roughly equal activity when assessing semantic connections.

=== Panic disorders ===
Panic disorders appear to modify levels-of-processing by increasing ability to recall words with threatening meanings over positive and neutral words. In one study, both implicit (free recall) and explicit (memory of emotional aspects) memorization of word lists were enhanced by threatening meanings in such patients.

=== Alzheimer's disease ===
Modern studies show an increased effect of levels-of-processing in Alzheimer patients. Specifically, there is a significantly higher recall value for semantically encoded stimuli over physically encoded stimuli. In one such experiment, subjects maintained a higher recall value in words chosen by meaning over words selected by numerical order.

=== Autism ===
In autistic patients, levels-of-processing effects are reversed in that semantically presented stimuli have a lower recall value than physically presented stimuli. In one study, phonological and orthographic processing created higher recall value in word list-recall tests. Other studies have explicitly found non-semantically processed stimuli to be more accurately processed by autistic patients than in non-autistic patients. No clear conclusions have been drawn as to the cause of this oddity.
