= Self-reference effect =

Psychological model

The self-reference effect is a tendency for people to encode information differently depending on whether they are implicated in the information. When people are asked to remember information when it is related in some way to themselves, the recall rate can be improved.

== Research ==
In 1955, George Kelly published his theory about how humans create personal constructs. This was a more general cognitive theory based on the idea that each individual's psychological processes are influenced by the way they anticipate events. This lays the groundwork for the ideas of personal constructs. Attribution theory is an explanation of the way people attribute the causes of behavior and events, which also involved creating a construct of self, since people can explain things related to themselves differently from the same thing happening to someone else. Related to the attribution theory, the fundamental attribution error is an explanation of when an individual explains someone's given behavior in a situation through emphasis on internal characteristics (personality) rather than considering the situation's external factors. Studies such as one by Jones, Sensenig, and Haley corroborated the idea that the self has a special construct, by simply asking experiment subjects to describe their "most significant characteristics". The results showed that the majority of responses were based on positive characteristics such as "sensitive", "intelligent", and "friendly". This ties in very well with other cognitive phenomena such as illusory superiority, in that it is a well observed fact that people rate themselves differently from how they rate others. In 2012, Stanley B. Klein published an article on the self and memory and how it relates to the self-reference effect. In recent years, studies on the self-reference effect have shifted from identifying mechanisms to using the self-reference as a research tool in understanding the nature of memory. Klein discusses words encoded with respect to oneself (the self-relevance effect) are recalled more often than words that are unrelated to the self.

In Japan, regarding memory, people who showed higher altruism tend not to exhibit self-reference effect.

== Associated brain regions ==
=== Cortical mid-line structures ===
In the past 20 years plus there has been an increase in cognitive neuroscience studies that focus on the concept of the self. These studies were developed in hopes of determining if there are certain brain regions that can account for the encoding advantages involved in the self-reference effect. A great deal of research has been focused on several regions of the brain collectively identified as the cortical midline region. Brain imaging studies have raised the question of whether neural activity in cortical midline regions is self-specific. A quantitative meta-analysis that included 87 studies, representing 1433 participants, was conducted to discuss these questions. The analysis uncovered activity within several cortical midline structures in activities in which participants performed tasks involving the concept of self. Most studies that report such midline activations use tasks that are geared towards uncovering neural processes that are related to social or psychological aspects of the self, such as self-referential judgments, self-appraisal, and judgments of personality traits. Also, in addition to their perceived role in several forms of self-representation, cortical midline structures are also involved in the processing of social relationships and recognizing personally familiar others. Studies that show midline activations during understanding of social interactions between others or ascribing social traits to others (impression formation) typically require subjects to reference the mental state of others.

=== Prefrontal cortex ===
There are several areas within the cortical midline structure that are believed to be associated with the self-reference effect. One of the more active regions involved in the self-reference effect appears to be the medial prefrontal cortex (mPFC). The prefrontal cortex (PFC) is the area of the brain that is believed to be involved in the planning of complex behavior and the expression and regulation of personality characteristics in social situations. The implication that the prefrontal cortex is involved in the regulation of unique internal personality characteristics illustrates how it may be an important component of the self-reference effect. The medial prefrontal cortex in both hemispheres has been proposed as a site of the "self model" which is a theoretical construct made of essential features such as feelings of continuity and unity as well as experience of agency.

The idea of the self-reference effect being linked to the medial prefrontal cortex stems from several experiments attempting to locate the mechanisms involved in the self-referencing process. Experiments in which participants were assigned tasks that required them to reflect on, or introspect about their own mental states showed activity in the medial prefrontal cortex. For example, activity in the ventromedial prefrontal cortex has been observed in tasks in which participants report on their own personalities or preferences, adopt a first person perspective, or reflect on their current affective state. Similar activity in the ventromedial prefrontal cortex is displayed in cases where participants show the memory advantage that emerges when items are encoded in a self-relevant manner. During various functional magnetic resonance imaging (fMRI) tests conducted while participants were performing self-referential tasks, there was a consistent showing of increases in blood-oxygen-level dependent (BOLD) signals in the ventral medial and dorsal medial prefrontal cortex. Measuring BOLD signals is necessary for a sound interpretation of fMRI signals, as BOLD fMRI reflects a complex monitoring of changes in cerebral blood flow, cerebral blood volume and blood oxygenation.

=== Parietal lobe ===
In addition to areas of the prefrontal cortex, research has suggested that there are areas within the parietal lobe that also play a role in activating the self-reference effect. During fMRI given during self-referential tasks there also appeared to be increases in BOLD signals within the medial and lateral parietal cortex To further determine whether or not the medial parietal lobe plays a role in self-referencing, participants were subjected to transcranial magnetic stimulation over the region. Stimulation over this region produced a decrease in the ability of participants to retrieve previous judgments of mental self when compared to the retrieval of judgment of others.

== Development over the lifespan ==
=== Childhood ===
The development of a sense of self and the understanding that one is separate and uniquely different from others is vital in the development of the self-reference effect advantage. As young children grow, their sense of self and understanding of the world around them is continuously increasing. Although this occurs at different stages for each child, research has shown rather early development of the self-reference advantage. Research focusing on the recall abilities of children have shown the self-referencing advantage in children as young as five years old. Language development appears to play a significant role in the development and use of the self-reference effect. Verbal labeling is among the first strategic behaviors shown by young children in order to enhance memory, and as children progress in age and language development, their performance on memory tasks involving self-referencing increases. A study done in 2011 on preschoolers found that observations on children as young as three years old suggests that the self-reference effect is apparent in event memory, by their ability to self-recognize.

=== Adulthood ===
Like children, the continuous development of a self-concept is related to the development of self-referencing in individuals. The relationships formed with intimate others over the lifespan appear to have an effect on self-referencing in relation to memory. The extent to which we include others in our self-concept has been a topic of particular interest for social psychologists. Theories of intimacy and personal relationships might suggest that the self-reference effect is affected by the closeness of a relationship with the other used as a target. Some researchers define closeness as an extension of self into other and suggest that one's cognitive processes about a close other develop in a way so as to include that person as part of the self. Consistent with this idea, it has been demonstrated that the memorial advantage afforded to self-referenced material can be diminished or eliminated when the comparison target is an intimate other such as a parent, friend, or spouse The capacity for utilizing the self-reference effect remains relatively high throughout the lifespan, even well into old age. Normally functioning older adults can benefit from self-referencing. Ageing is marked by cognitive impairments in a number of domains including long-term memory, but older adults' memory performance is malleable. Memory strategies and orientations that engage "deep" encoding processes benefit older adults. For example, older adults exhibit increased recall when using self-generated strategies that rely on personally relevant information (e.g., important birthdates) relative to other mnemonic strategies. However, research has shown that there are some differences between older adults and younger adults use of the self-reference advantage. Like young adults, older adults exhibit superior recognition for self-referenced items. But the amount of cognitive resources an individual has influence on how much older adults benefit from self referencing. Self-referencing improves older adult's memory, but its benefits are restricted regardless of the social and personally relevant nature of the task. A reason for this change in self referencing may be the change in brain activation that has been observed in older adults when studying self-referencing. Older adults showed more activity in the medial prefrontal cortex and along the cingulate gyrus than young adults. Because these regions often are associated with self-referential processing, these results suggest that older adults' mnemonic boost for positive information may stem from an increased tendency to process this information in relation to themselves. It has been proposed that this "positivity shift" may occur because older adults put more emphasis on emotion regulation goals than do young adults, with older adults having a greater motivation to derive emotional meaning from life and to maintain positive affect.

== Effect on students ==
Students are often challenged when faced with the attempt to recall memories. It is therefore important to understand the effects of self-reference encoding for students and beneficial ways it can increase their recall of information. The purpose of the current study was to examine the effects of, self-referent encoding.

Rogers, Kuiper, and Kirker (1977) performed one of the first studies examining the self-reference effect making it a foundational article. The focus of the study was to identify the importance of the self and how it is implicated when processing personal information. The self-reference effect has been considered a robust encoding strategy and has been effective over the past 30 years (Gutches et al., 2007). The process behind this study was to gather students and divide them into four different task groups and they would be asked to give a yes or no answer to a trait adjective being presented to them. The four tasks that were used were: structural, phonemic, semantic, and self-reference. There were some different theories that support the study. The personality theory stressed that the observer's network when looking at the trait adjectives is an essential part of how they process personal information Hastorf et al. (1970). Another theory that supports this study is the attribution theory. It is another example where a person's organization traits fit with the self-reference effect Jones et al. (1971). The self is visualized as a schema that is involved with processing personal information, interpretation, and memories which is considered a powerful and effective process (Rogers et al., 1977).

Gutchess, Kensinger, and Schacter (2007) performed a study where they used age as a factor when looking at the self-reference effect. The first and second experiment looks at the young and older adults and they are presented with encoded adjectives and they must decide if it describes them. The third experiment is deciding if they found these traits desirable towards themselves. The age difference was shown effective with the self-reference effect leaving the older adults showing superiority of recognition for self-referenced items that were relative. Although, self-referencing the older adults did not have the same restoring level as the younger adults. A major factor that played in this study was the availability of cognitive resources. When there was a greater availability of cognitive resources, the ability to enhance memory similarly for both young and older adults diverged from socioemotional processing (Gutches et al., 2007).

Hartlep and Forsyth (2001) performed a study using two different approaches when studying for an exam. The first approach was the survey, question, read, reflect, recite, and review method which is called the SQR4. The other method was the self-reference method. The third group was a controlled group and received no special instructions on their studying process (Hartlep & Forsyth, 2001). This study is considered an applied study. People who have a more elaborative cognitive framework, the better they will be able to retrieve a memory. The most elaborative cognitive framework someone can have is knowledge of themselves (Hartlep & Forsyth, 2001). The self-reference effect is viable when having strict lab conditions. When students are studying, if they can see the material as an elaboration of what they already remember or can relate to personal experiences, their recall would be enhanced (Hartlep & Forsyth, 2001). Although, the self-reference method can enhance recall of memory in certain instances, unfortunately for this study, there were no significant differences between the two study methods.

Serbun, Shih and Gutchess (2011) performed a study involving the effects of general and specific memory when using the self-reference effect. The study created a gap in research due to the experiments being tested. The first experiment uses visuals details of objects where the second and third experiment use verbal memory to assess the self-reference effect. The self-reference effect enhances both general and specific memory and can improve the accuracy and richness of a memory (Serbun et al., 2011). We know how the self-reference effect works, but instead of using trait adjectives to assess recall, we are looking at trait adjectives. The results from the experiments show that self-referencing does not function only through the increase in familiarity or general memory for the object, but enhances memory for details of an event. This likely draws on more recollected processes. This information supports that self-referencing is effective of encoding a rich, detailed memory towards not only general memory, but specific memories.

(Nakao et al., 2012) performed a study to show the relation between the self-reference effect and people that are highly in altruism and low in altruism. This all starts with the medical prefrontal cortex (MPFC). People who are high in altruism did not show the self-reference effect compared to the participants low in altruism. The participants who frequently chose the altruistic behavior refer to the social desirability as a backboard (Nakoa et al., 2012). The relation the self-reference effect and altruism is the MPFC. When using the self-reference effect, people who are low in altruism, the same part of the brain is being used. Whereas the same is for people who are high in altruism when using social desirability. Social desirability ties into the different types of memory enhancement can vary for individual differences of past experiences. People's individual differences can show similar effects as the self-reference effect (Nakoa et al., 2012).

The self-reference effect is a rich and powerful encoding process that can be used multiple ways. The self-reference effect shows better results over the semantic method when processing personal information. Processing personal information can be distinguished and recalled differently with age. The older the subject, the more rich and vivid the memory can be due to the amount of information the brain has processed. The self-reference just as effective as the SQR4 method when study for exams, but the self-reference method is preferred. Defining general and specific memories using objects, verbal cues, etc. can be effective when using the self-reference effect. When using these different method, the same part of the brain is being active resulting in relation and better recall. It was expected that participants would recall the most number of words from the self-referent list rather than from the semantic or structural lists and more words from the semantic list than from the structural list. It was also expected that for the words encoded in the self-referent condition, fewer words would be recalled by participants in the high altruism group than in the low altruism group.

== Evolutionary mechanism ==
Research suggests that the self-reference effect is connected to personal survival among the human race. There is this survival effect which is defined as the enhancement of memory when encoding material meant for survival, which has shown to have a significant correlation with the self-reference effect. The interesting thing is research has found that this memory enhancement does not work when given by another person; in order for it to work, it must come from the person themselves. As this advancement of encoding incoming memories is an evolutional mechanism that we the human race has inherited from the challenges faced by our ancestors. Nairne et al. (2007) noted that our advanced ability to recall past events may be to help us as a species to solve issues, which would relate to survival. Weinstein et al. (2008) concluded in their study that people are able to encode and retrieve information that is related to survival more than information that doesn't relate to survival. However, researchers theorize that there is not just one kind of self-reference effect that people pose, rather a group of them for different purposes other than survival.

== Examples ==
- The tendency to attribute someone else's behavior to their disposition, and to attribute one's own behavior to the situation. (The Fundamental attribution error)
- When asked to remember words relating to themselves, subjects had greater recall than those receiving other instructions.
- In connection with the levels-of-processing effect, more processing and more connections are made within the mind in relation to a topic connected to the self.
- In the field of marketing, Asian consumers self-referenced Asian models in advertising more than White consumers. Also Asian models advertising products that were not typically endorsed by Asian models resulted in more self-referencing from consumers.
- People are more likely to remember birthdays that are closer to their own birthday than birthdays that are more distant.
- Research shows that long term memory is improved when learning occurs under self-reference conditions
- Research shows that female consumers engage in self-referencing when viewing female models of different body shapes in advertising. For example, Martin, Veer and Pervan (2007) examined how the weight locus of control of women (i.e., beliefs about the control of body weight) influence how they react to female models in advertising of different body shapes. They found that women who believe they can control their weight ("internals"), respond most favorably to slim models in advertising, and this favorable response is mediated by self-referencing.

== See also ==
- List of biases in judgment and decision making
- List of memory biases
- Personal construct theory
- Self
