= Information processing (psychology) =

Approach to understanding human thinking

In cognitive psychology, information processing is an approach to the goal of understanding human thinking that treats cognition as essentially computational in nature, with the mind being the software and the brain being the hardware. It arose in the 1940s and 1950s, after World War II. The information processing approach in psychology is closely allied to the computational theory of mind in philosophy; it is also related to cognitivism in psychology and functionalism in philosophy.

== Two types ==
Information processing may be vertical or horizontal, either of which may be centralized or decentralized (distributed). The horizontally distributed processing approach of the mid-1980s became popular under the name connectionism. The connectionist network is made up of different nodes, and it works by a "priming effect," and this happens when a "prime node activates a connected node". But "unlike in semantic networks, it is not a single node that has a specific meaning, but rather the knowledge is represented in a combination of differently activated nodes"(Goldstein, as cited in Sternberg, 2012).

== Models and theories ==
There are several proposed models or theories that describe the way in which we process information.

=== Sternberg's triarchic theory of intelligence ===
Sternberg's theory of intelligence is made up of three different components: creative, analytical, and practical abilities. Creativeness is the ability to have new original ideas, and being analytical can help a person decide whether the idea is a good one or not. "Practical abilities are used to implement the ideas and persuade others of their value". In the middle of Sternberg's theory is cognition and with that is information processing. In Sternberg's theory, he says that information processing is made up of three different parts, meta components, performance components, and knowledge-acquisition components. These processes move from higher-order executive functions to lower-order functions. Meta components are used for planning and evaluating problems, while performance components follow the orders of the meta components, and the knowledge-acquisition component learns how to solve the problems. This theory in action can be explained by working on an art project. First is a decision about what to draw, then a plan and a sketch. During this process there is simultaneous monitoring of the process, and whether it is producing the desired accomplishment. All these steps fall under the meta component processing, and the performance component is the art. The knowledge-acquisition portion is the learning or improving drawing skills.

=== Serial exhaustive memory scanning ===
Psychologist Saul Sternberg introduced the concept of high-speed memory scanning in the 1960s, a key discovery that helped shape the field of information processing. In a series of experiments, Sternberg (1966, 1969) asked participants to memorize small sets of numbers and then decide whether a test number had been part of the set. He found that reaction time increased in a straight line as the number of items grew, suggesting that people check each item in memory one by one—a process known as serial exhaustive search. This finding provided some of the first evidence that mental operations occur in orderly, measurable stages. Decades later, Sternberg (2016) defended this model, emphasizing its continued importance in understanding how the mind processes and retrieves information.

=== Individual patterns in working memory ===
Building on classic models of memory, DeStefano, Vul, and Brady (2025) examined how people store and recall visual information in working memory. In their experiments, participants were asked to remember and reproduce colors from memory, revealing consistent personal “attractor” biases toward certain hues. These patterns showed that memory errors are not random but shaped by individual perception and past experience. Their research expanded the information processing approach by showing that the brain’s handling of visual information depends not only on external stimuli but also on stable internal cognitive tendencies. This work highlights how processing information involves both universal mechanisms and individual differences.

=== Information processing model: the working memory ===
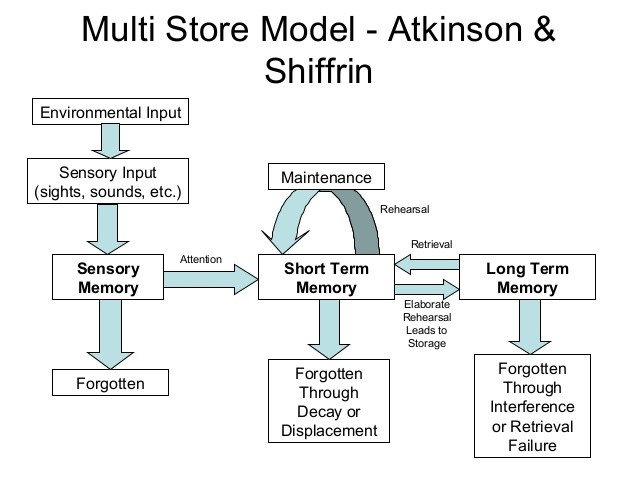
Adapted from Atkinson, R.C. and Shiffrin, R.M. (1968). 'Human memory: A Proposed System and its Control Processes'.

Information processing has been described as "the sciences concerned with gathering, manipulating, storing, retrieving, and classifying recorded information". According to the Atkinson-Shiffrin memory model or multi-store model, for information to be firmly implanted in memory it must pass through three stages of mental processing: sensory memory, short-term memory, and long-term memory.

An example of this is the working memory model. This includes the central executive, phonologic loop, episodic buffer, visuospatial sketchpad, verbal information, long-term memory, and visual information. The central executive is like the secretary of the brain. It decides what needs attention and how to respond. The central executive then leads to three different subsections. The first is phonological storage, subvocal rehearsal, and the phonological loop. These sections work together to understand words, put the information into memory, and then hold the memory. The result is verbal information storage. The next subsection is the visuospatial sketchpad which works to store visual images. The storage capacity is brief but leads to an understanding of visual stimuli. Finally, there is an episodic buffer. This section is capable of taking information and putting it into long-term memory. It is also able to take information from the phonological loop and visuospatial sketchpad, combining them with long-term memory to make "a unitary episodic representation. In order for these to work, the sensory register takes in via the five senses: visual, auditory, tactile, olfactory, and taste. These are all present since birth and are able to handle simultaneous processing (e.g., food – taste it, smell it, see it). In general, learning benefits occur when there is a developed process of pattern recognition. The sensory register has a large capacity and its behavioral response is very short (1–3 seconds). Within this model, sensory store and short term memory or working memory has limited capacity. Sensory store is able to hold very limited amounts of information for very limited amounts of time. This phenomenon is very similar to having a picture taken with a flash. For a few brief moments after the flash goes off, the flash it seems to still be there. However, it is soon gone and there is no way to know it was there. Short term memory holds information for slightly longer periods of time, but still has a limited capacity. According to Linden, "The capacity of STM had initially been estimated at "seven plus or minus two" items, which fits the observation from neuropsychological testing that the average digit span of healthy adults is about seven. However, it emerged that these numbers of items can only be retained if they are grouped into so-called chunks, using perceptual or conceptual associations between individual stimuli." Its duration is of 5–20 seconds before it is out of the subject's mind. This occurs often with names of people newly introduced to. Images or information based on meaning are stored here as well, but it decays without rehearsal or repetition of such information. On the other hand, long-term memory has a potentially unlimited capacity and its duration is as good as indefinite. Although sometimes it is difficult to access, it encompasses everything learned until this point in time. One might become forgetful or feel as if the information is on the tip of the tongue.

=== Cognitive development theory ===
Another approach to viewing the ways in which information is processed in humans was suggested by Jean Piaget in what is called the Piaget's Cognitive Development Theory. Piaget developed his model based on development and growth. He identified four different stages between different age brackets characterized by the type of information and by a distinctive thought process. The four stages are: the sensorimotor (from birth to 2 years), preoperational (2–6 years), concrete operational (6–11 years), and formal operational periods (11 years and older). During the sensorimotor stage, newborns and toddlers rely on their senses for information processing to which they respond with reflexes. In the preoperational stage, children learn through imitation and remain unable to take other people's point of view. The concrete operational stage is characterized by the developing ability to use logic and to consider multiple factors to solve a problem. The last stage is the formal operational, in which preadolescents and adolescents begin to understand abstract concepts and to develop the ability to create arguments and counter arguments.

Furthermore, adolescence is characterized by a series of changes in the biological, cognitive, and social realms. In the cognitive area, the brain's prefrontal cortex as well as the limbic system undergoes important changes. The prefrontal cortex is the part of the brain that is active when engaged in complicated cognitive activities such as planning, generating goals and strategies, intuitive decision-making, and metacognition (thinking about thinking). This is consistent with Piaget's last stage of formal operations. The prefrontal cortex becomes complete between adolescence and early adulthood. The limbic system is the part of the brain that modulates reward sensitivity based on changes in the levels of neurotransmitters (e.g., dopamine) and emotions.

In short, cognitive abilities vary according to our development and stages in life. It is at the adult stage that we are better able to be better planners, process and comprehend abstract concepts, and evaluate risks and benefits more aptly than an adolescent or child would be able to.

In computing, information processing broadly refers to the use of algorithms to transform data—the defining activity of computers; indeed, a broad computing professional organization is known as the International Federation for Information Processing (IFIP). It is essentially synonymous with the terms data processing or computation, although with a more general connotation.

== See also ==
- Information engineering – Engineering discipline
- Computer data processing – Use of automated methods to process commercial data
- Information processing technology and aging

== Bibliography ==
- Denning, P. J. & Bell, T. (2012). "The Information Paradox". American Scientist. Vol. 100, no. 6. pp. 470–477. doi:10.1511/2012.99.470.
- Horst, Steven (Spring 2011). "The Computational Theory of Mind". In Edward N. Zalta (ed.). The Stanford Encyclopedia of Philosophy (Spring 2011 ed.).
- Lehrl, S. & Fischer, B. (1990). "A Basic Information Psychological Parameter (BIP) for the Reconstruction of Concepts of Intelligence". European Journal of Personality. 4 (4): 259–286. doi:10.1002/per.2410040402. S2CID 143547241.
- Linden, D. E. (2007). "The working memory networks of the human brain". The Neuroscientist. 13 (3): 257–269. doi:10.1177/1073858406298480. PMID 17519368. S2CID 23799348.
- McGonigle, D. & Mastrian, K. (2011). Introduction to information, information science, and information systems (PDF) (2 ed.). Jones & Bartlett. p. 22.
- McLeod, S. A. (2010). "Formal operational stage". SimplyPsychology.
- Nake, F. (1974). Ästhetik als Informationsverarbeitung [Aesthetics as information processing] (in German). Springer. ISBN 978-3-211-81216-7., ISBN 978-3-211-81216-7
- Presnell, F. (1999). "Jean Piaget". Archived from the original on 2017-10-28.
- Shannon, C. & Weaver, W. (1963). The mathematical theory of communication. Urbana, IL: University of Illinois Press.
- Steinberg, L. (2010). Adolescence (9th ed.). New York, NY: McGraw Hill.
- Sternberg, R. J. & Sternberg, K. (2012). Cognitive psychology (6th ed.). Belmont, California: Wadsworth. pp. 21, 193–205, 212–213.
- Eppler, M.J.; Mengis, J. (2004). "The Concept of Information Overload: A Review of Literature from Organization Science, Accounting, Marketing, MIS, and Related Disciplines". The Information Society. 20 (5): 325–344. doi:10.1080/01972240490507974.

DeStefano, I., Vul, E., & Brady, T. F. (2025). Beyond uniform perception: Individual and stimulus-specific differences in visual working memory. Journal of Experimental Psychology: Human Perception and Performance, 51(11), 1476–1501. https://doi.org/10.1037/xhp0001335

- DeStefano, I.; Vul, E. & Brady, T. F. (2025). "Beyond uniform perception: Individual and stimulus-specific differences in visual working memory". Journal of Experimental Psychology: Human Perception and Performance. 51 (11): 1476–1501. doi:10.1037/xhp0001335.
- Oberauer, K. & Lewandowsky, S. (2019). "Addressing the theory crisis in psychology". Psychonomic Bulletin & Review. 26 (5): 1596–1618. doi:10.3758/s13423-019-01645-2.
- Ranganath, C. (2006). "Working memory for visual objects: Complementary roles of inferior temporal, medial temporal, and prefrontal cortex". Neuroscience. 139 (1): 277–289. doi:10.1016/j.neuroscience.2005.06.092.
- Cowan, N. & Alloway, T. P. (2009). "Development of working memory in childhood". The Psychology of Learning and Motivation. 51: 1–31. doi:10.1016/S0079-7421(09)51001-7.
- Baddeley, A. (2012). "Working memory: Theories, models, and controversies". Annual Review of Psychology. 63: 1–29. doi:10.1146/annurev-psych-120710-100422.
