= Ranschburg effect =

Psychological theory

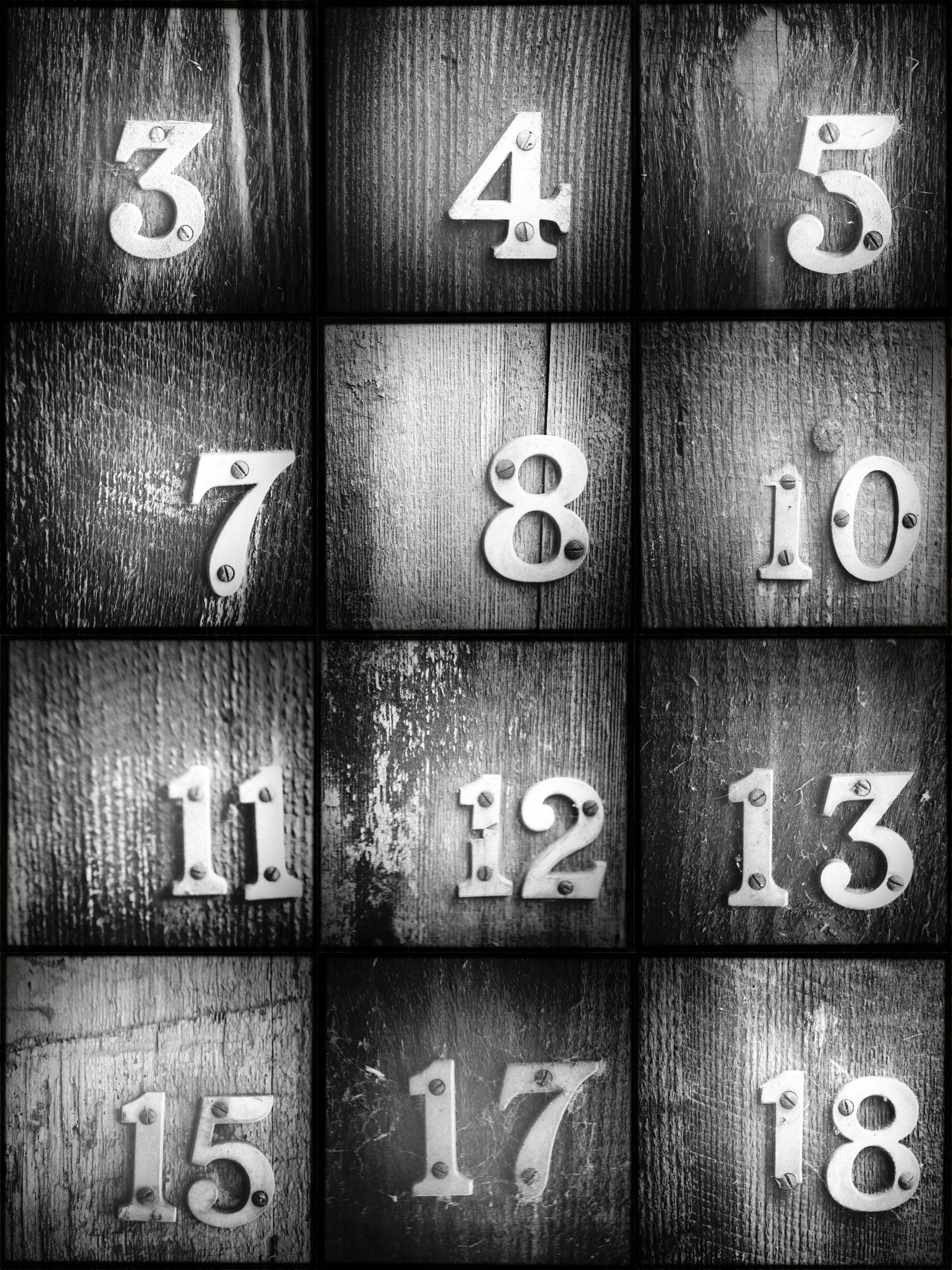
Number sequence

The Ranschburg effect, sometimes referred to as Ranschburg inhibition, is a psychological theory which refers to the substandard recall of repeated items, or listed items, in a short sequence. According to a 1973 paper in the Journal of Verbal Learning and Verbal Behavior, the Ranschburg effect is interpreted as a result of a restricted guessing strategy that excludes repetitions of remembered items as possible responses. This term is also described as the deterioration in memory performance when items are repeated in a list of items to be remembered. The Ranschburg effect can also be referred to as repetition inhibition, which should not be mistaken for repetition blindness, which refers to the failure or inability to recall repeated items from the short-term memory when sequences are presented rapidly.

The Ranschburg effect is named after Hungarian psychiatrist Paul Ranschburg, who reported the phenomenon in 1901. The bulk of studies of the Ranschburg effect use lists that range from 8 to 10 digits with only one repeated element. A study in The Psychology of Ageing: An Introduction found that Ranschburg effect is greater among older than younger adults since it is suggested that the inhibitory processes act against repeating items.

== General overview of research ==
Early studies of the Ranschburg effect and its outcomes regarding immediate recall suggested that repeated items impaired recall performance regardless of the position of such items within a sequence. Modern studies indicate that positioning of repeated items within a sequence does influence recall performance, where repeated items positioned adjacently within a sequence demonstrate better recall performance than repeated items that are not positioned adjacently. In some experimental instances, sequential presentation of the items was used rather than simultaneous presentation, where both presentation methods report poorer recall of repeated items than non-repeated items. When testing the presence of the Ranschburg effect, major procedural differences suggest the possibility of two separate Ranschburg effects. When repeated items within a sequence are positioned adjacently, an ‘isolation’ effect occurs as a subject is able to recall each repeated item within a context of different non repeated items. This methodological difference when presenting repeated items suggests the possible existence of two separate Ranschburg effects, however it is essentially two method variants as opposed to separate effects. Even when a subject is aware that a sequence may contain a repeated item, the Ranschburg effect can still be present.

== Background ==
Paul Ranschburg was a Hungarian psychologist born in Győr, Hungary on January 3, 1870. Ranschburg came from an orthodox rabbinate Jewish family and was raised in western Hungary. Ranschburg studied at the University of Budapest and received his M.D. in 1894, and founded a psychological laboratory at the Psychiatric Clinic, which later became an independent state institution in 1905. Ranschburg established the Psycho-Physiological laboratory within the Nervous Disease Department of the Medical Faculty in Budapest in 1899, and was a founding member of the Hungarian Child Study Association and head of the Experimental Psychology Division. Ranschburg primarily researched memory, specifically relating to neurology and psychopathology. Ranschburg received international attention following the publication of his paper about the Ranschburg effect in 1902, which detailed the new phenomenon he had observed that specified homogenous inhibition. Ranschburg first described the phenomenon as a ‘homogenous inhibition’ that refers to difficulty in memory recall when presented with similar or homogenous elements in a learning list. Ranschburg’s scientific achievements coincide with the transitional period of psychology occurring when experimental methods were being developed and ideas of behaviourism, Gestalt theory and psychoanalysis were emerging.

== Findings ==
The Ranschburg effect can be attributed to a subject’s failure to detect repeated items, and the application of inappropriate guessing strategies when attempting to improve short-term memory recall performance.

=== Guessing strategies ===
Guessing strategies are utilised by a subject in order to maximise memory span and improve overall recall performance. The Ranschburg effect is eliminated when subjects are instructed to avoid guessing strategies, however this causes the validity and reliability of the test to also become eliminated. Repetition inhibition, otherwise known as the presence of the Ranschburg effect, can be produced by output interference and guessing strategies.

The poorer recall of repeated items in a short sequence that occurs when the Ranschburg effect is present is primarily understood as being attributed to the result of restricted guessing strategies. Such guessing strategies disregard the repetition of remembered items as possible responses, and therefore result in poorer memory recall when items are repeated in sequences. If all subjects employed the same guessing strategy of restricting guesses to the set of items they had not already recalled, they would be unable to fully recount the item sequence correctly. This signifies the result of applying an inappropriate guessing strategy when attempting to improve short-term memory recall performance of a sequence containing repeated items.

=== Sequence configuration ===
The presence of the Ranschburg effect decreases correlatively as set size increases, suggesting that the extent of the effect is dependent on improved performance on non-repeated items. Situational experience of the subjects when testing the Ranschburg effect also suggests that guessing strategies and biases can be modified. The omission or incorrect recall of a repeated item within a sequence of otherwise different items results in the presence of the Ranschburg effect. Serial recall of repeated items within the short-term memory is more accurate when repeated items are positioned in close proximity within a sequence than when items are positioned far apart. Repeated items positioned at the beginning or end of a sequence also improves the rate of detection and absence of the Ranschburg effect. When repeated items within a sequence are separated by two or more intervening items, there are reports that there is a significant decline in the recall accuracy of the repeated item, and the Ranschburg effect is produced. When repeated items are positioned adjacently to one another, recall facilitation is significantly improved.

=== Age ===
The Ranschburg effect is more common in older adults than young adults, with greater response suppression and repetition inhibition results increasing with age. Repetition of an item within a list of items is also shown to impair immediate serial recall of a list of items within subjects. When comparing item recall of sequences with a repeated item and sequences with no repeated items, the recall performance was poorer in sequences with a repeated item than sequences with all different items. When repeated items occur within a sequence, recall of the second repeated item is generally poorer than first repeated item. Poorer recall performance in sequences with repeated items suggests that such experimental conditions have a perceptual or memorial basis, however Ranschburg’s work does not allow for a differentiation between the two. The presence of the Ranschburg effect is more likely to increase when subjects are presented with items positioned in the middle of a sequence rather than items positioned at the ends of the lists.

=== Tagging ===
Noting a repeated item during the encoding process can be referred to as tagging, and is more likely to occur when repeated items are positioned next to each other or close together. Specifically, the immediate repetition of an item can be tagged within the short-term memory in order to increase the probability of accurately recalling the repetition, demonstrating the impact that the position of the repeated items within a sequence can have. Although subjects may correctly encode the repetition of an item within a sequence, they do not necessarily consciously notice it. This results in the omission of the second repetition of an item within a sequence, and results in the presence of the Ranschburg effect. When presented with verbal stimuli, the Ranschburg effect is produced by a response suppression mechanism. The suppression mechanism within the short-term memory is based on the premise that items appearing early within a sequence have the highest activation levels when prompting recall. Items that possess high activation are the items are recalled first when recalling a sequence, which is also referred to as competitive queuing within the short-term memory. The suppression mechanism produces the recall of items with lower activation levels. The presence of a repetition tagging mechanism is also used when recalling repeated items within verbal stimuli.

Response suppression rates are improved when the duration of the presentation of a sequence is longer. When an item is suppressed, the recall of its second occurrence is inhibited. This is due to the failure to tag the repeated item within the short-term memory as a repeated item, and therefore facilitates the Ranschburg effect. This suggests that the Ranschburg effect is produced within the retrieval stage of the items, not the encoding stage.

=== Short-term memory input and output ===
Repetition inhibition rests on the basic theory that repeated items within a sequence face a negative bias against repetition during recall. When subject resort to guessing strategies in an attempt to improve short-term recall, there is a negative implication for repeated items as there is a natural tendency or reluctance for people to repeat themselves. When a subject detects the event of a repetition but is unable to recall which item was repeated, they can resort to guessing. When a subject fails to accurately retrieve or guess the second occurrence of a repeated item, repetition inhibition occurs. Retrieval and guessing failures suggest the presence of a response suppression during the recall stage. Unless a subject is able to accurately detect, identify and remember the second occurrence of a repeated item, the Ranschburg effect is present. Input and output processes within the short-term memory can influence the production or presence of the Ranschburg effect. During the input process of information within the short-term memory, the encoding, attentional, and perceptual processes play an important role in the ability to accurately output and recall a sequence. Failure to appropriately encode or perceive a repeated item can produce the Ranschburg effect. Output processes within the short-term memory include memory and retrieval, and can also contribute substantially to the production of the Ranschburg effect.

Due to the correlative relationship between output interference and the production of the Ranschburg effect, output interference is demonstrated to be a significant contributor to recall inhibition. This correlation suggests that any technique or strategy that reduces output interference should also reduce the likelihood of the Ranschburg effect occurring. This indicates that Ranschburg effect functions as a production of the retrieval procedure. The inhibitory effects of intraserial repetition, otherwise known as the Ranschburg effect, can therefore be reduced through minimising output interference.

== Experimental conditions ==
In order to demonstrate the Ranschburg effect, a subject is briefly presented with a sequential list of stimuli containing a repeated item and instructed to recall them. When the subject is asked to reproduce the items in a serial order, poor recall indicates the Ranschburg effect. Sequences generally contain between six and ten stimuli items, where the inclusion of repeated items is correlative with prompting the Ranschburg effect. Stimuli items can include digits, letters and words, with digits being the original item used during the development of the Ranschburg effect theory. Subjects are tested individually, and are asked to complete several recall sequences.

Repetition facilitation and repetition inhibition are robust, where the temporal conditions of sequence presentation impacts the probability and accuracy of detecting repeated items. This can be attributed to an automatic suppression of previously presented items, and a bias against guessing repeated items. A subject’s ability to detect a repeated item within a sequence is necessary for repetition facilitation, where the failure to detect a repeated item is a result of repetition inhibition. In order to overcome repetition inhibition, the detection of the repeated item must be consciously noticed during presentation, as well as remembering which specific item was repeated when recalling the sequence. Presentation rate refers to speed at which items within a sequence are presented. Presentation modality refers to the positioning of such items within a sequence, specifically items that are repeated.
