= Nicole Anderson (psychologist) =

Professor at University of Toronto (born 1966)

- Born: 1966 (age 59–60)

Academic background
- Education: University of Toronto (MA, PhD), Washington University in St. Louis (AB)
- Thesis: Effects of divided attention on encoding and retrieval processes in younger and older adults (1997)
- Doctoral advisor: Fergus Craik

Academic work
- Discipline: Psychology
- Sub-discipline: Memory, neuropsychology
- Institutions: University of Toronto

Nicole Dianne Anderson (born 1966) is a Canadian psychologist who is Professor of Psychology and Psychiatry at the University of Toronto. She is also a registered clinical neuropsychologist. She is known for her works on ageing, memory and neuropsychology. Anderson is a fellow of the American Psychological Association. She was an associate editor of the Journal of Gerontology: Psychological Sciences from 2014-2019.

== Books ==
- Living with Mild Cognitive Impairment: A Guide to Maximizing Brain Health and Reducing Risk of Dementia, with Kelly J. Murphy and Angela K. Troyer, Oxford University Press 2012
