= Negative priming =

Initial stimulus inhibits response to subsequent stimulus

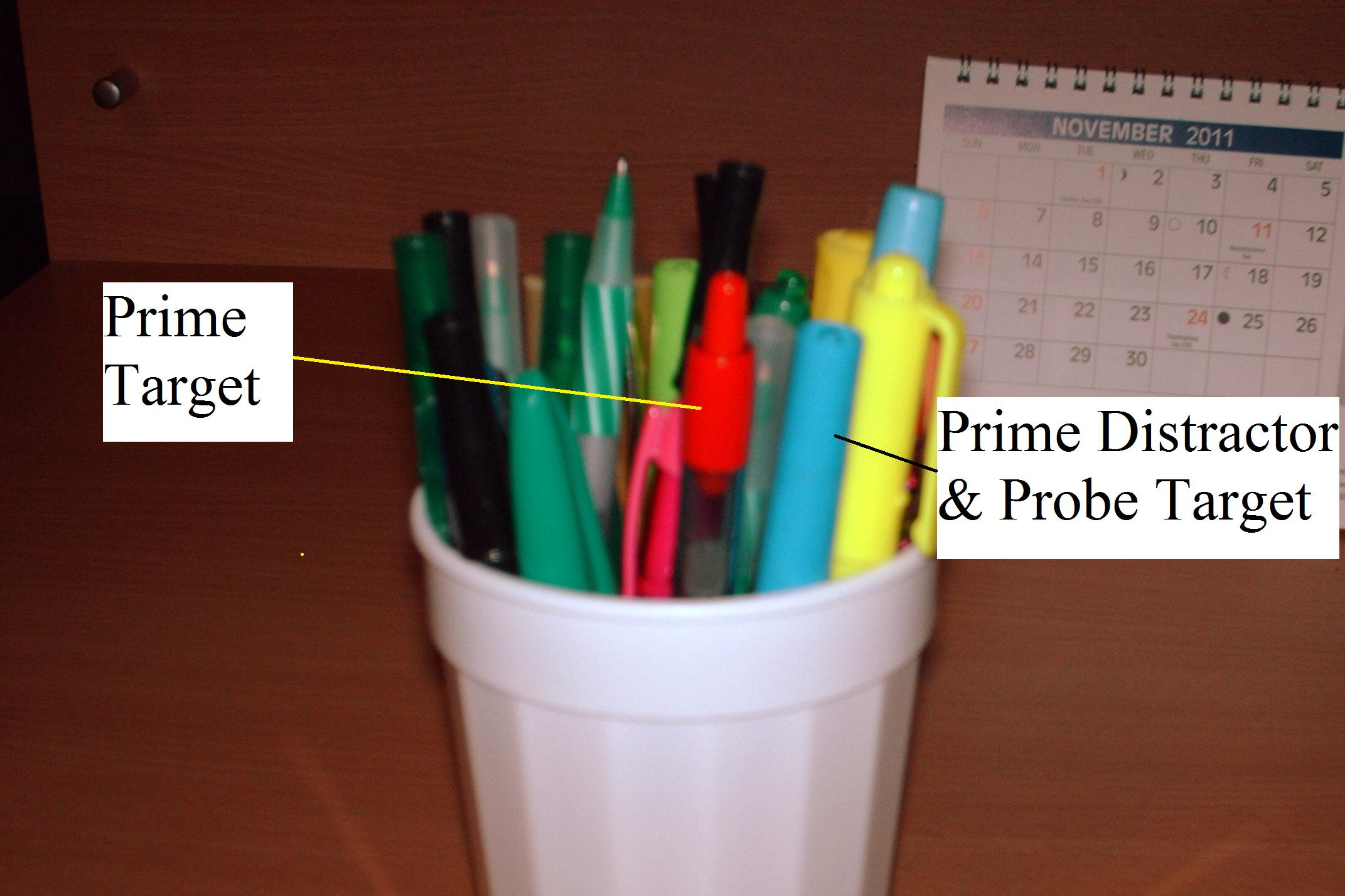
Initially, the person picks out the red pen and therefore it is the prime target while the remaining pens in the holder are considered to be prime distractors. When the person wants to use the blue pen (probe target) instead, negative priming effects are observed as the blue pen was previously ignored as the prime distractor.

Negative priming is an implicit memory effect in which prior exposure to a stimulus unfavorably influences the response to the same stimulus. It falls under the category of priming, which refers to the change in the response towards a stimulus due to a subconscious memory effect. Negative priming describes the slow and error-prone reaction to a stimulus that is previously ignored. For example, a subject may be imagined trying to pick a red pen from a pen holder. The red pen becomes the target of attention, so the subject responds by moving their hand towards it. At this time, they mentally block out all other pens as distractors to aid in closing in on just the red pen. After repeatedly picking the red pen over the others, switching to the blue pen results in a momentary delay picking the pen out (however, there is a decline in the negative priming effect when there is more than one nontarget item that is selected against). The slow reaction due to the change of the distractor stimulus to target stimulus is called the negative priming effect.

Negative priming is believed to play a crucial role in attention and memory retrieval processes. When stimuli are perceived through the senses, all the stimuli are encoded within the brain, where each stimulus has its own internal representation. In this perceiving process, some of the stimuli receive more attention than others. Similarly, only some of them are stored in short-term memory. Negative priming is highly related to the selective nature of attention and memory.

Broadly, negative priming is also known as the mechanism by which inhibitory control is applied to cognition. This refers only to the inhibition stimuli that can interfere with the current short-term goal of creating a response. The effectiveness of inhibiting the interferences depends on the cognitive control mechanism as a higher number of distractors yields higher load on working memory. Increased load on working memory can in turn result in slower perceptual processing leading to delayed reaction. Therefore, negative priming effect depends on the amount of distractors, effectiveness of the cognitive control mechanism and the availability of the cognitive control resources.

== Theories and classic models ==
There are a number of theories and models that try to explain the reason behind negative priming. They all try to reason negative priming's role in cognition and justify why it occurs. A few of the well-known models are presented below.

=== Distractor inhibition model ===
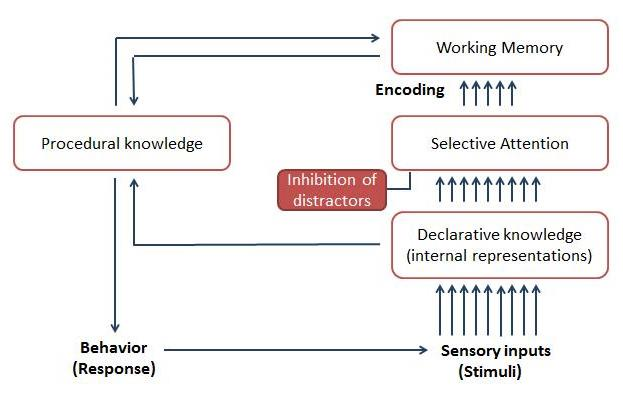
Distractor inhibition model with selective attention and encoding process.

Distractor inhibition model is the oldest model that explains the negative priming effect as the result of selective attention to a target stimulus. When we pay attention to a particular stimulus, we perceive other stimuli surrounding the target as distractors in order to help focus. But when one of those distractors becomes the new target of attention, our response to the target is hampered due to immediate residual inhibition. Selective attention is the ability to respond to a specific object when there are other distractors that also compete for a response. To explain this selective attention, the distractor inhibition model proposes a dual mechanism involving excitation to boost target signal and inhibition to suppress distractors. This inhibition is triggered when there is a mismatch between the internal representations of the target and a distractor. Inhibition of the distractor's internal representation is a way of helping to selectively attend to the target stimulus. This inhibition decays gradually when the stimulus is no longer present to help with the next target. However, if a distractor stimulus is re-encountered as the target, the internal representation of the distractor stimulus may continue to be suppressed because it is too soon for the decay to dissipate already. This is referred to as the transient residual inhibition. This inhibition also impairs the processing of an appropriate response to the new target stimulus and results in greater reaction time.

There are a few problems associated with this inhibition model. This model accounts for negative priming only when the stimuli are repetitively ignored as distractors during a goal directed behavior of selecting the target stimulus. This model does not support negative priming effects found in cases short of goal directed behavior. Another issue is that negative priming effects have been found to be long-term contradicting to the proposed transient residual inhibition. Long-term persistence of negative priming questions the validity of the distractor inhibition model.

=== Episodic retrieval model ===
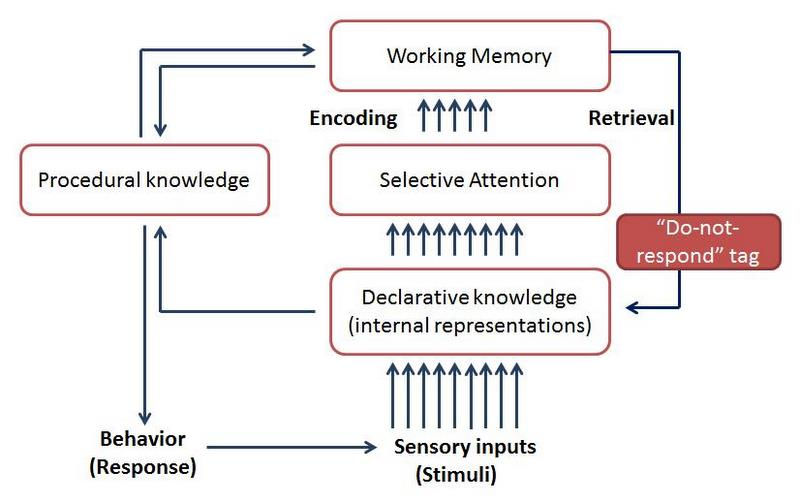
Episode retrieval model with the retrieval of "do-not-respond" tag.

The episodic retrieval model is the current popular model and explains that negative priming occurs due to memory retrieval. This model theorizes that each encounter with a stimulus is encoded and stored separately as an individual episode. Each episode includes perceptual details of both the stimuli and the response developed for that stimulus. When a stimulus is encountered the second time, the previous episode regarding that stimulus along with its tags of perceptual details, role in selective attention, and response given are all retrieved automatically. When the repetitively ignored distractor stimulus is encountered as the target, a tag associated with the response to the stimulus is also retrieved. This response tag of a distractor will likely be "do-not-respond" tag as opposed to the "respond" tag of the target stimulus. Retrieval of the previous "do-not respond" tag of the stimulus conflicts with the current "respond" tag. This presents a problem of whether to respond or not. Resolving this conflict takes time and produces negative priming effect.

Episode retrieval model has gained more popularity over the last decade compared to the distractor inhibition model due to the issues with long-term negative priming. Episode retrieval varies from the distractor inhibition model because it claims that the negative priming occurs only when the memory of the stimuli is retrieved and not during the encoding of the distractor stimuli. Recent findings lean towards this model but the model itself is not entirely complete. Its idea of association tags like the "do-not-respond" tag is vague and needs concrete evidence to support this model.

=== Houghton–Tipper model ===
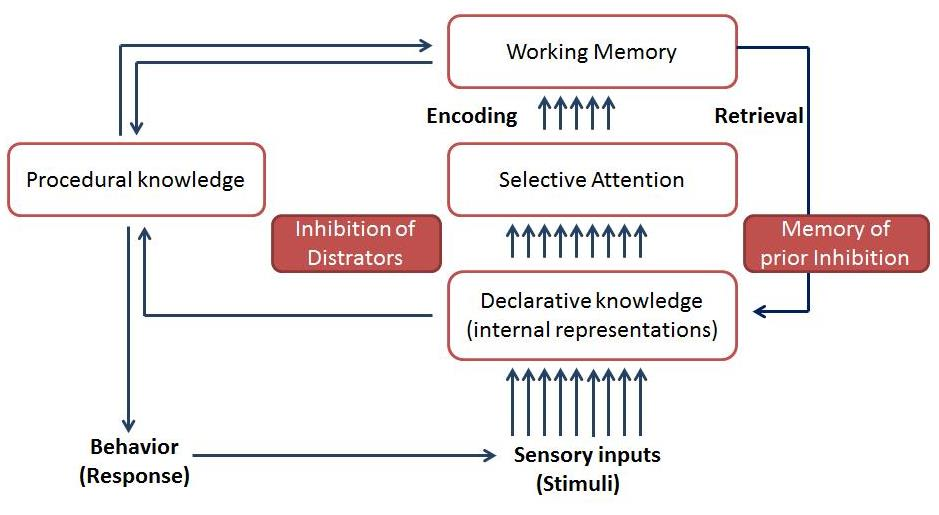
Houghton–Tipper model with inhibition occurring during encoding and retrieval.

Due to the issues found with the distractor inhibition model, Tipper and Houghton modified the distractor inhibition model to account for long-term negative priming effects. The original inhibition account proposed that inhibition occurs only when the distractors are suppressed. The Houghton–Tipper model revised this proposition and claims that inhibition occurs during both the encoding of distractors and the retrieval of that memory. The main reason for this change is to explain the long-term negative priming and justify it using the new combined model. When a repeated distractor becomes the target, processing of this stimulus automatically retrieves the memory of the stimulus being inhibited as a distractor. This model suggests that inhibition occurs when ignoring the distractor and during the memory retrieval of the previous ignorance of the stimulus. Therefore, it incorporates the inhibition account in selective attention and the episode retrieval model.

=== Feature mismatch hypothesis ===
This theory proposes that negative priming effect is the result of interference due to the target being located where the distractor was once located. When the target stimulus and distractor stimulus are repeatedly placed in the same location, we know their respective location and pay attention more to the location of the target than the target itself. Our response to the target is also faster because we have already identified where to pay attention. This is called Simon effect, which refers our innate tendency to respond faster and more accurately when stimuli occur in the same location. This can be explained by neuroscience in terms of neural facilitation and short-term plasticity. However, if the positions of the stimuli are not the same as before, it is no longer easy to attend to the target as it once was. The feature mismatch hypothesis states that inhibition occurs when there is a mismatch between the target and its location. This theory is explains the effects of location specific negative priming but lacks in its justification of negative priming when location is not involved. It deviates from the distractor inhibition model to describe location specific negative priming but has more loop holes than the other models.

=== Temporal discrimination model ===
Temporal discrimination model attempts to blend in both the selective attention and memory retrieval aspects of negative priming in a less complex model. It is based on the assumption that negative priming is caused only at the moment of response to a stimulus that was previously considered distractor. This model explains negative priming as the delayed response due to confusion in classifying a stimulus as old or new. A new stimulus is immediately classified as new and undergoes perceptual processing. A repeated old stimulus is familiar and cues the automatic retrieval of the prior episode. A stimulus that has been repetitively ignored prior to becoming the target is neither entirely new nor old. This ambiguity slows down the processing of the stimuli. The temporal discrimination model points to this ambiguity as the cause of slowed categorization of the stimulus leading to negative priming effect. Like feature mismatch hypothesis, this model also claims that negative priming is not due to selective attention of the target or the inhibition of the distractor. This model argues that "negative priming is an emergent consequence of a discrimination process that is inherent to memory retrieval". Temporal discrimination model explains negative priming without reference to inhibition of distractors or the "do not respond" tag and by simple discrimination of "old", "new" and "in between" categories.

== Characteristics of negative priming in experiments ==
=== Experimental terminology ===
Experiments on negative priming consist of two main components: prime and probe. Prime trial tries to mimic real life experiences of distractor stimuli in target selection but with more repetition to get quantifiable negative priming data. It comprises the initial presentation and the repetitive trials of the target and the distractor stimuli. It is set up such that a set of distractor stimuli are constantly ignored in the process of target selection. In the previous example provided, prime refers to the repeated perception of the blue pen as the distractor. Probe trial in an experiment refers to the actual testing for negative priming effects. In this trial, the repeated distractor of the prime trial is presented as the target. The reaction time of the response for the probe target (prime distractor) is measured to quantify the negative priming effect.

Some experiments may use additional interferences such as changing the position of the stimuli or presenting completely irrelevant stimuli during either of these trials. The magnitude of negative priming effects are found to be higher with these interferences. Interferences are used to investigate how the response to the distractor changes under conditions of a third interfering stimulus.

=== Stimulus modality ===
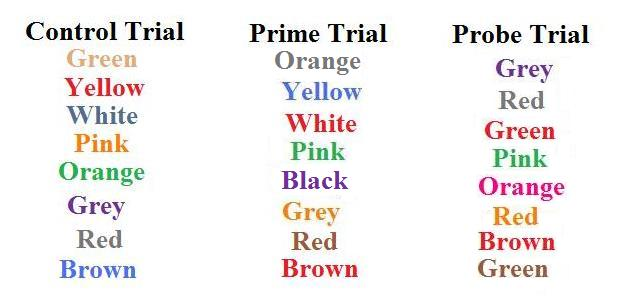
Example of Stroop color–word task with control, prime and probe trials.

The primary two stimulus modalities used for negative priming research are visual and auditory stimulus materials. The stimulus presented varied from objects or symbols in visual field to human voices or artificial sounds. Stronger negative priming effects are found for auditory stimulus but the standardized effect sizes between the modalities did not vary. Evidence for negative priming has also been found across various modes of response including vocal naming, manual key press, and reaching. Negative priming was observed for various types of judgment such as identification, categorization, matching, counting and localization. The tasks used to find evidence for negative priming includes Stroop color–word task, lexical decision task, identification, matching, and localization tasks. The Stroop color–word task utilizes the Stroop effect to observe the distractor suppression and negative priming. Identification tasks present a set of images, sounds, words, symbols, or letters and require the subject to select the prime target based a particular feature that differentiates the target from the distractor. Lexical decision utilizes semantic knowledge of the subject and tests the subject ability to remember the multiple meanings and uses of one word. For example, the word "bank" has multiple meanings and can be referred in different contexts such as "bank is a place where money is deposited" or "banks of a river". Matching tasks require subjects to respond "same" or "different" by matching the target letters or shapes with the explicitly specified goal while ignoring the distractor. Localization tasks require some form of movement of subjects to respond to the location of the target stimulus. This type of localization task is especially used to test the feature mismatch hypothesis as it provides evidence for negative priming during the mismatch of the location and target stimuli.

=== RSI effects ===
Response–stimulus interval (RSI) is another form of data that is used to quantify negative priming. RSI is the time difference between the response to prime target and the onset of probe trial. Negative priming effects are observed for delays of 20 millisecond to 8000 millisecond between the prime trial and the probe trial. Several experiments found that negative priming decays rapidly during this delay between prime and probe trials. Many studies have tried to find a rate of this decay but have not been successful. Researchers of both the distractor inhibition model and episode retrieval model use varying results of the RSI effects to justify the decay as a part of their model. More globally accepted research is needed to determine concrete RSI data and establish short-term and long-term negative priming limits.

== Neuroanatomy and imaging ==
Neurological evidence of negative priming effects is being researched to help understand the physiological aspects and to develop more accurate models. The most common method to find such neurological evidence is by neuroimaging the brain using fMRI while subjects go through experiments of tasks that prompt negative priming effects. The two primary bases for neurological evidence are the internal representations of stimuli and memory retrieval. Most significantly activated regions of the brain are the left temporal lobe, inferior parietal lobe, and the prefrontal cortex of the frontal lobe. Evidence for internal representations are found in the left anterior temporal cortex, which has been associated with abstract semantic knowledge representations. The left anterolateral temporal cortex was found to be directly related to the magnitude of negative priming effect. The inferior parietal lobe is connected to the shifts in attention that occurs when attending to the distractors and the target. The inferior parietal cortex activated whenever attention shifted from the distractor to target stimulus or vice versa. Another significant area of activation was found in the prefrontal cortex. The superior, inferior, and medial frontal gyri, and the medial prefrontal cortex exhibited activation during the negative priming tasks. Activations in the frontal lobe has been associated with inhibitory network and selective attention. Similarly, evidences for semantic representations and temporal lobe activations are used to support the episode retrieval model. In an fMRI meta-analysis, in addition to the right middle frontal gyrus, left superior temporal gyrus and precuneus, the anterior cingulate cortex was revealed across fMRI studies. Whether the cingulate cortex is directly involved in negative priming processes or due to the contrast between congruent and mismatching stimuli is still up for debate. Additional investigations of the neurophysiological data of negative priming are necessary to further clarify the relationship between selective attention and memory in negative priming.

== Pathology ==
Negative priming is identified as one of the cognitive process necessary for goal directed behaviors. It is associated with many cognitive processes such as inhibition, selective attention, encoding, memory retrieval, and short-term memory. Neuropsychiatric disorders may be due to problems with some of the above-mentioned areas of cognition. Currently, schizophrenia, obsessive compulsive disorder, and Tourette syndrome are being studied with reference to negative priming. Understanding the paradigm of negative priming can lead to the use of negative priming tasks as diagnosing tools to identify the disorders. Knowledge about the physiological basis of negative priming can also help in designing therapies or treatment for neuropsychiatric disorders.

== Conclusion ==
Among the four theories, the feature mismatch hypothesis and the temporal discrimination model lack solid evidence and are inadequate. These two models differ slightly from the distractor inhibition model and episode retrieval model respectively and can be incorporated into the latter two. The distractor inhibition model was the dominant model until recent contradicting findings pointed to a retrieval mechanism in negative priming. The episode retrieval model is gaining more support for the memory based negative priming but lacks in its explanation of the association tags. Perhaps, further research exploring both these models may help to better understand the role of negative priming in attention, memory and cognition.

== See also ==
- Attention
- Inhibition of return
- Priming (psychology)
- Thought suppression
- Working memory
