= Dual systems model =

Theory in developmental cognitive neuroscience

The dual systems model, also known as the maturational imbalance model, is a theory arising from developmental cognitive neuroscience which posits that increased risk-taking during adolescence is a result of a combination of heightened reward sensitivity and immature impulse control. In other words, the appreciation for the benefits arising from the success of an endeavor is heightened, but the appreciation of the risks of failure lags behind.

The dual systems model hypothesizes that early maturation of the socioemotional system (including brain regions like the striatum) increases adolescents' attraction for exciting, pleasurable, and novel activities during a time when cognitive control systems (including brain regions like the prefrontal cortex) are not fully developed and thus cannot regulate these appetitive, and potentially hazardous, impulses. The temporal gap in the development of the socioemotional and cognitive control systems creates a period of heightened vulnerability to risk-taking during mid-adolescence. In the dual systems model, "reward sensitivity" and "cognitive control" refer to neurobiological constructs that are measured in studies of brain structure and function. Other models similar to the dual systems model are the maturational imbalance model, the driven dual systems model, and the triadic model.

The dual systems model is not free from controversy, however. It is highly contested and debated within developmental psychology and neuroscientific fields whether or not when the prefrontal cortex is said to be fully or efficiently developed. Most longitudinal evidence suggests that myelination of gray matter in the frontal lobe is a very long process and may be continuing until well into middle age or greater, and major facets of the brain are recorded to reach mature levels in one's mid-teens, including the parts that are responsible for response inhibition and impulse control, suggesting that many later age markers may ultimately be arbitrary.

== Historical perspective ==
The dual systems model arose out of evidence from developmental cognitive neuroscience providing insight into how patterns of brain development could explain aspects of adolescent decision-making. In 2008, Laurence Steinberg's laboratory at Temple University and BJ Casey's laboratory at Cornell separately proposed similar dual systems theories of adolescent risky decision-making. Casey et al. termed their model the maturational imbalance model.

The majority of evidence for the dual systems model comes from fMRI. However, in 2020 the model gained support from a study looking at brain tissue structural measures. Volumetric analysis and mechanical property measures from magnetic resonance elastography showed that individual differences in tissue microstructural development correlated with adolescent risk taking, such that individuals whose risk taking centers were more structurally developed relative to their cognitive control centers, were at greater likelihood to take risks.

== Models ==
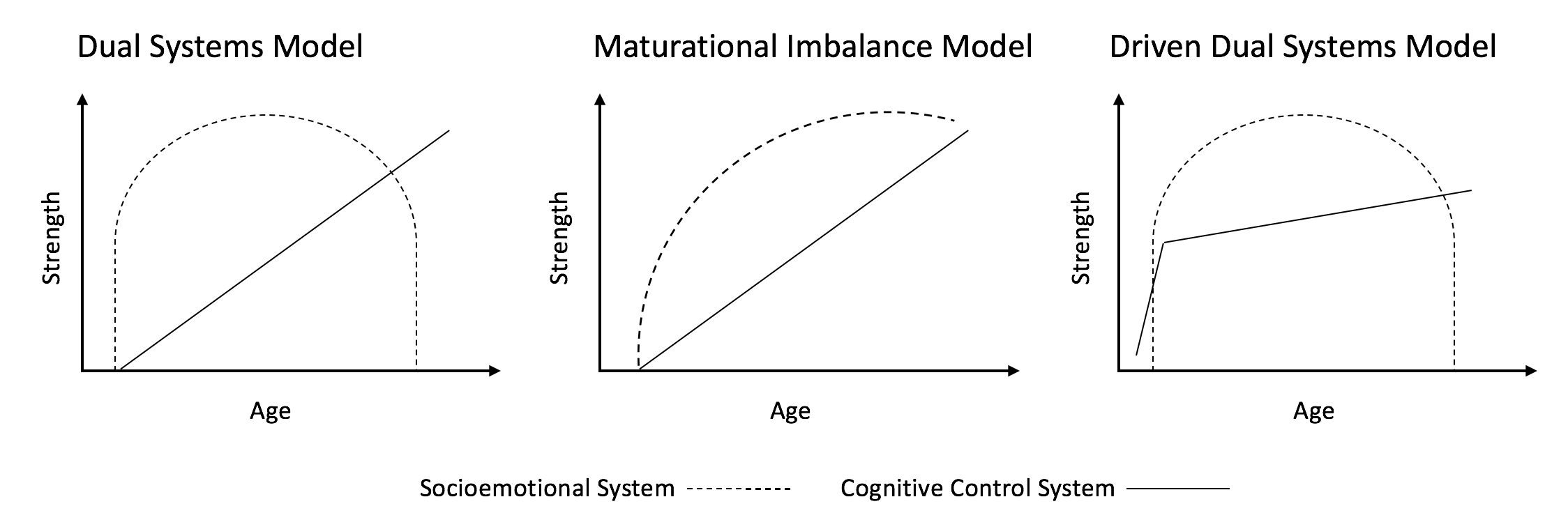
Development of the socioemotional and cognitive control systems as depicted by the dual systems model, maturational imbalance model, and driven dual systems model

=== Maturational imbalance model ===
Both the dual systems model and the maturational imbalance model conceive of a slower developing cognitive control system that matures through late adolescence. The dual systems model proposes an inverted-U shape development of the socioemotional system, such that reward responsivity increases in early adolescence and declines thereafter. The maturational imbalance model portrays a socioemotional system that reaches its peak around mid-adolescence and then plateaus into adulthood. Further, the dual systems model proposes that the development of the cognitive control and socioemotional systems is independent whereas the maturational imbalance proposes that the maturation of the cognitive control system leads to dampening of socioemotional responsivity.

=== Driven dual systems model ===
Recently, another variation of the dual systems model was proposed called the "driven dual systems model". This model proposes an inverted-U shaped trajectory of socioemotional system responsivity, similar to the dual systems model, but hypothesizes a cognitive control trajectory that plateaus in mid-adolescence. This cognitive control trajectory differs from that proposed by the dual systems model and maturational imbalance model which continues to increase into the early 20s. Similar to the driven dual systems model, a model has been proposed including a hyperactive socioemotional system that undermines the regulatory ability of the cognitive control system. These later models hypothesize that cognitive control development is completed by mid-adolescence and attribute increased risk-taking during adolescence to the hyperarousal of the socioemotional system. The dual systems model and maturational imbalance model propose that cognitive control development continues into early adulthood and that increased risk-taking in adolescence is attributable to a developmental imbalance where the socioemotional system is at its peak of development but the cognitive control system developmental trajectory lags behind.

=== Triadic model ===
The "triadic model", which includes a third brain system responsible for emotion processing and primarily implicating the amygdala. The triadic model proposes that this emotion system increases impulsivity during adolescence by increasing the perceived cost of delaying decision-making. This model posits that impulsivity and risk seeking in adolescence is due to a combination of hyperactive reward systems causing adolescents to approach appetitive stimuli, emotion processing systems causing adolescents to enhance perceived costs of delaying behaviors and reduce avoidance of potentially negative stimuli, and an underdeveloped cognitive control system that is unable to regulate reward-seeking behaviors.

== Adolescent risk-taking ==
Risk-taking in certain, but not all, domains peaks during adolescence. Most notably, mortality and morbidity rates increase significantly from childhood to adolescence despite the fact that physical and mental capabilities increase during this period. The primary cause for this increase in mortality/morbidity among adolescents is preventable injury. According to the Center for Disease Control, in 2014 about 40% of all adolescent deaths (ages 15–19 years) were caused by unintentional accidents. From 1999 to 2006, almost one-half of all adolescent deaths (ages 12–19 years) were due to accidental injury. Of these unintentional injuries, about 2/3 are due to motor vehicle accidents, followed by unintentional poisoning, unintentional drowning, other land transportation accidents, and unintentional discharge of firearms.

The dual systems model proposes that mid-adolescence is the time of highest biological propensity for risk-taking, but that older adolescents may exhibit higher levels of real-world risk-taking (e.g., binge drinking is most common during the early 20s) not due to greater propensity for risk-taking but due to greater opportunity. For example, individuals in their early 20s compared to mid-adolescence have less adult supervision, greater financial resources, and greater legal privileges. The dual systems model looks to experimental paradigms in developmental neuroscience for evidence of this greater biological propensity for risk-taking.

There is also a consistent relation between age and crime with adolescents and young adults being more likely to engage in violent and non-violent crime. These findings are linked to increases in sensation-seeking, which is the tendency to seek out novel, exciting, and rewarding stimuli, during adolescence, and continued development of impulse control, which is the ability to regulate one's behavior. The dual systems model points to brain development as a mechanism for this association.

=== Reward seeking ===
Across many species including humans, rodents, and nonhuman primates, adolescents demonstrate peaks in reward-seeking behaviors. For example, adolescent rats are more sensitive than adult rats to rewarding stimuli and show enhanced behavioral responses to novelty and peers. Adolescent humans show peaks in self-reported sensation-seeking, increased neural activation to monetary and social rewards, greater temporal discounting of delayed rewards, and heightened preferences for primary rewards (e.g., sweet substances).

Sensation-seeking is a type of reward seeking involving the tendency to seek out novel, exciting, and rewarding stimuli. Sensation-seeking has been found to increase in preadolescence, peak in mid-adolescence, and decline in early adulthood.

=== Impulsivity ===
Impulsivity has been found to exhibit a different developmental trajectory than reward or sensation seeking. Impulsivity gradually declines with age in a linear fashion. Around mid-adolescence when impulsivity and sensation-seeking are at their peak is the theoretical peak age for risk-taking according to the dual systems model.

=== Social influence ===
Adolescent risk-taking is more likely to occur in the presence of peers compared to adults. Animal studies have found that adolescent mice, but not adult mice, consume more alcohol in the presence of peers than when alone. In humans, the presence of peers has been found to result in increased activation in the striatum and orbitofrontal cortex risk-taking, and activation in these regions predicted subsequent risk-taking among adolescents but not adults. Age differences in activation of the striatum and frontal cortex have been interpreted to suggest heightened risk-taking in the presence of peers is due to the influence of peers on reward processing rather than the influence of peers on cognitive control.

== Socioemotional system ==
The term socioemotional brain network or system (also known as the ventral affective system) refers to the striatum as well as the medial and orbital prefrontal cortices.

=== Dopamine ===
Evidence from rodent studies indicates the dopaminergic system, the pathway connecting the ventral tegmental area to the nucleus accumbens and olfactory tubercle, plays a critical role in the brain's reward circuitry and the dopamine-rich striatum has been implicated as a key contributor to reward sensitivity in the brain.

During puberty, the dopaminergic system undergoes significant reorganization. Increased dopamine projections from mesolimbic areas (e.g., the striatum) to the prefrontal cortex have been observed during mid- and late-adolescence. These projections are pruned/decline in early adulthood. Adolescent-specific peaks in dopamine receptors in the striatum have been observed in humans and rodents. Additionally, dopamine concentrations projecting to the prefrontal cortex increase into adolescence as do the dopamine projections from the prefrontal cortex to the striatum (namely the nucleus accumbens).

=== Hyper- versus hypo-sensitivity to reward ===
The striatum has been linked to reward processing, learning, and motivation.

==== Hyperactivity ====
Neuroimaging studies using functional magnetic resonance imaging (fMRI) have shown that the ventral striatum is more active among adolescents compared to children and adults when receiving monetary rewards, primary rewards, and social rewards. Peaks in striatal activity as associated with increased self-reported risk-taking.

==== Hypoactivity ====
Some studies have found that striatum activity is blunted compared to children and adults when anticipating rewards, which has been linked to greater risk-taking behaviors. The theory linking this hypoactivation to greater risk-taking is that adolescents experience less gratifying experience from anticipating rewards and they are therefore motivated to seek out more reward-inducing experiences to achieve the same level of reward sensation as other age groups.

==== Current consensus ====
Although evidence exists for both adolescent hyper-responsiveness to rewards and hypo-responsiveness to rewards, the field of developmental neuroscience has generally converged on the view of hyper-responsiveness. In other words, that is, that adolescents are motivated, in part, to engage in greater reward-seeking behaviors because of developmental changes in the striatum that contribute to hypersensitivity to reward.

== Cognitive control system ==
The cognitive control system refers to the lateral prefrontal, lateral parietal, and anterior cingulate cortices. The most commonly investigated region is the prefrontal cortex which undergoes substantial development throughout adolescence. The development of the prefrontal cortex has been implicated in the ability to regulate behavior and engage in inhibitory control.

As a result of synaptic pruning and myelination of the prefrontal cortex, improvements in executive functions have been observed during adolescence.

=== Synaptic pruning ===
During development, the brain undergoes overproduction of neurons and their synaptic connections and then prunes those that are unnecessary for optimal functioning. This developmental process results in grey matter reduction over development. During adolescence, this pruning process is specialized with some areas losing approximately half of their synaptic connections but others showing little change. Total grey matter volume undergoes substantial pruning starting around puberty. The process of grey matter loss (i.e., maturation) occurs differentially in different brain regions with frontal and occipital poles losing grey matter early, but the prefrontal cortex losing grey matter only at the end of adolescence.

=== Myelination ===
In addition to synaptic pruning, the brain undergoes myelination, which influences the speed of information flow across brain regions. Myelination involves neuronal axons connecting certain brain areas to become insulated with a white, fatty substance called myelin that increases the speed and efficiency of transmission along axons. Myelination increases dramatically during adolescence. Myelination contributes to the developmental thinning or reduction in grey matter in the prefrontal cortex during adolescence.

=== Links to inhibitory control ===
Evidence supporting the dual systems model theory of delayed maturation of the cognitive control system is supported by evidence of structural changes like cortical thinning as well as less diffuse activation of frontal regions during inhibitory control tasks from adolescence to adulthood. Regardless of age, increased activation of the prefrontal cortex is related to better performance on response inhibition tasks.

== Experimental paradigms ==
=== Reward tasks ===
Three primary experimental paradigms are used to study reward behavior in adolescents (1) passive receipt of reward, (2) reward conditional on task performance, and (3) decision-making selecting different types of reward options.

==== Passive exposure tasks ====
Passive exposure tasks generally involve exposing the participant to pleasant stimuli (e.g., monetary reward, attractive faces). These paradigms also involve exposure to negative stimuli for the purposes of comparison (e.g., monetary loss, angry faces). Although these tasks are more commonly used to investigate emotion processing rather than reward, some studies have used a slot-machine passive task to target reward circuitry in the brain. Faces have also been used as reward for motivational paradigms. Passive exposure tasks have been found to activate the striatum and orbitofrontal cortex, with striatal activation greater in adolescents in response to rewarding stimuli but orbitofrontal activation greater in adults in response to negative stimuli.

==== Performance contingent tasks ====
Reward tied to task performance typically involves participants being asked to complete a task in order to obtain a reward (and sometimes to avoid losing a reward). Task performance is not necessarily directly related to the reward. Examples of this type of task are the Pirate's paradigm, monetary incentive delay (MID) task, Iowa Gambling Task, Balloon Analogue Risk Task (BART), and Columbia Card Task, among others. Differences in activation to anticipation of reward versus preparation to try to achieve reward have been reported on performance related reward tasks.

==== Decision-making tasks ====
Reward decision-making tasks involve participants being asked to choose among different options of reward. Sometimes the rewards differ on probability, magnitude, or type of reward (e.g., social versus monetary). These tasks are typically conceived to not have a correct or incorrect response, but rather to have decision-making based on the participants' preference. Examples of decision making tasks include delay discounting tasks and the Driving Game. During feedback on decision-making tasks, greater striatal activation to rewarding outcomes has been observed in adolescents compared to adults.

=== Response inhibition tasks ===
Common response inhibition tasks are the Go/No-Go, Flanker, Stroop, Stop Signal, and anti-saccade tasks. Individuals who perform well on these tasks generally activate the prefrontal cortex to a greater extent than individuals who perform poorly on these tasks. Performance on these tasks improves with age.

==== Go/No-Go task ====
The Go/No-Go task requires participants to respond, usually by pressing a button or a key on a computer keyboard, to a designated cue or withhold a response, by not pressing the button/key, to a different designated cue. Variants of this task include alphabet letters, shapes, and faces.

==== Flanker task ====
The Flanker task typically involves presentation of a target flanked by non-target stimuli that is either in the same direction as the target (congruent) or in the opposite direction of a target (incongruent) or neither direction (neutral). Participants have to respond to the direction of the target ignoring the non-target stimuli.

==== Stroop tasks ====
Stroop tasks require participants to respond to one facet of the presented stimuli (e.g., read the word) but ignore another competing facet (e.g., ignore a contradictory color).

==== Stop signal task ====
The Stop Signal task is similar to the Go/No-Go task in that participants see a cue indicating a go trial. For stop trials, participants see the go cue but then are presented with the stop signal (typically a sound) indicating they should not respond to the go trial. Presenting the stop signal after the go cue makes this task more difficult than traditional Go/No-Go tasks.

==== Anti-saccade task ====
Anti-saccade tasks typically require participants to fixate on a motionless target. A stimulus is then presented on one side of the target and the participant is asked to make a saccade (either move their eyes or respond with a button press) in the direction away from the stimulus.

== Legal relevance ==
Adolescent developmental immaturity and culpability were central to three US Supreme Court cases: Roper v. Simmons, Graham v. Florida, and Miller v. Alabama. Prior to Roper in 2005, the Supreme Court had relied on common sense standards to determine adolescent culpability. For example, in Thompson v. Oklahoma, the Court prohibited capital punishment for individuals under the age of 16 stating that "Contemporary standards of decency confirm our judgment that such a young person is not capable of acting with the degree of culpability that can justify the ultimate penalty." In Roper, however, the Court looked to developmental science as rationale for abolishing capital punishment for juveniles. In 2010, the Court ruled life without parole was unconstitutional for juveniles in Graham and in 2012 the Court ruled that States could not mandate life without parole for juveniles even in the case of homicide in Miller. In Miller, the Court stated "It is increasingly clear that adolescent brains are not yet fully mature in regions and systems related to higher-order executive functions such as impulse control, planning ahead, and risk avoidance."

== Criticism ==
=== Lack of empirical evidence ===
Most criticism of the dual systems model arises from one continual error; the lack of actual evidence proving a casual relation between youth misbehavior and a dysfunctional brain. Despite countless studies of maturation of the adolescent brain, there has never been a notable study that necessarily confirms that cognitive control is immature. In fact, according to most available research, cognitive control likely has a plateau in the mid-teens. A 1995 study by Linda S. Siegel of the Ontario Institute for Studies in Education found that "working memory peaks at fifteen or sixteen". This finding was reinforced in a 2015 study on peaks in cognitive functioning of the brain. Additionally, a 2004 study indicated that "response inhibition" and "processing speed" reached adult levels by the age of fourteen and fifteen, respectively. Inhibitory control is defined as the capacity voluntarily to inhibit or regulate prepotent attentional or behavioral responses. Inhibitory control involves the ability to focus on relevant stimuli in the presence of irrelevant stimuli and to override strong but inappropriate behavioral tendencies. Knowing when this faculty reaches maturity could inform discussion on the matter.

Prefrontal cortex pruning is also recorded to level off by age 15, and has been seen to continue as late as into the sixth decade of life. White matter is recorded to increase up until around the age of 45, and then it is lost via progressive aging. If myelination continues into one's forties and fifties, this could potentially shed serious doubt on the commonly cited claim that myelination is only complete in the twenties.

There is also a lack of evidence indicating the limbic system being mature (and sensation seeking peaking) while the executive functioning of the brain remains immature. In one longitudinal study, individual differences in working memory predicted subsequent levels of sensation seeking even after controlling for age, suggesting that sensation-based risk taking rises in concert with executive function.

=== Misinterpretation of data ===
==== No-Go Task ====
Researchers have also been accused of misrepresenting the data gathered from their studies. In one example, a commonly cited study to reference the immaturity of the brain in adolescence is a 2004 study involving a no-go task comparing teens and adults. Adolescents aged 12 to 17 were measured along with adults aged 22 to 27 with an MRI device while performing a task involving earning money. They were then told to press a button after a short period. Some symbols indicated that pressing the button would result in more money, while failing to respond would result in less. Areas of the brain were monitored during the session, and both groups seemed to perform well on the study. However, brain activity differed in one area specifically during the high-payment trials where the average activity of neurons in the right nucleus accumbens, but not in other areas that were monitored. Researchers drew a modest conclusion from this study, indicating that there were qualitative similarities in the processing abilities of adolescents and adults. However, it was reported instead that the study found a "biological reason for teen laziness", despite the study seeming to neither confirm nor deny that statement. This has led to some criticism in how these studies and the results they gather were being interpreted, either through baseless speculation with even accusations of malicious intent levied at journalists and researchers.

Laurence Steinberg, BJ Casey, and others have asserted that 18-21 year olds are more comparable to young teens in terms of risk assessment and perform worse than adults 22 years of age and older. However, 22-25 year olds sampled in studies perform worse than 26-30 year olds in terms of cognitive function under emotional pressure. Older groups were not surveyed.

==== The Teenage Brain ====
In Frances Jensen's book, "The Teenage Brain", Jensen claims that myelination of the brain's frontal lobes is not finished until well into one's twenties and provides a study in support of her claim. However, the study did not necessarily come to that conclusion. The study included a group of adolescents with a mean age of 13.8 and it compared the average size of certain brain region's gray matter in that group to the average size of certain brain region's gray matter in the adult group, with a mean age of 25.6. However, they did not show brain development in individuals, and the size of each group was only about 10 people. Brain size can also vary massively between different people of the same age. Furthermore, "gray matter" was measured with the overall size of some macrostructures and claimed that a reduction in gray matter means an increase in white matter. The study may not have shown any activity relating to white matter at all. The study has been criticized for seemingly measuring brain sizes instead of development of the brain at continuous ages. The study also uses 23 year olds in the adult group, who have been considered by researchers to have somewhat immature brains. Nonetheless, such claims may seem unreliable with this conduction of research.

==== Psychosocial Maturity ====
Another major study headed by Laurence Steinberg were tests that focused on cognitive maturity and psychosocial maturity. These studies found that cold cognitive maturity reached adult levels at 16, whereas psychosocial (or, hot cognitive maturity) was reached around 25. Cold cognition relates more to the raw function of the brain and ability to process information and operate competently. Hot cognition relates more to social or emotional maturity, or impulse control. However, some on the study had not reached sufficient adult levels of hot cognitive maturity by age 30 or greater, whereas some were able to achieve hot cognitive maturity by age 14 or 15. This, coupled with the fact that the study never went anywhere near the brain, suggests that social immaturity of adolescents and young adults could be influenced by culture or environment rather than by biological means.

=== Accusations of forwarding ideology ===
Some proponents of Dual Systems Theory have been accused of forwarding certain agendas involving expansion of universal education, including the idea that youth are biologically predisposed to immaturity, which is then corrected by them pursuing education. This accusation goes back to the early 20th century, when G. Stanley Hall theorized that adolescence was an inevitable and necessary stage of life. He advocated for the undergraduate to be exempt from adult responsibilities, and that students have the freedom to be lazy. His definition of adolescence included girls going through it from age twelve to twenty one and males from age fourteen to twenty five. This may be where the commonly cited myth of the male and female brain maturing at these ages originates from. However, Hall's claims were not supported by any evidence. He would propose a new stage of life that would delay entry into the world of work and that any attempt to restrict the time spent in school or college was "an attempt to return to more savage conditions". This provides some credence that the troubled teen industry is driven by motivation to expand the education system.

== Newer Theories ==
=== Center for the Developing Adolescent ===
As of July 2022, adolescent brain researchers have taken a new direction in their research and have seemingly abandoned the 'imbalance/immaturity' theory in place of adolescent brains having a specific advantage, such as being highly adaptable but also possessing of adult-level cognitive maturity at a young age. This makes it a special period of development, and despite the window ultimately being between age 10 and 25, it has been noted that brain development is not 'incomplete' before the end of this window, nor is it completely finished with this window. As seen above and as seen with more up-to-date research, maturation of the brain goes on for much of adult life and does not necessarily have a 'completion' date.
