= Inhibitory control =

Cognitive process

Inhibitory control, also known as response inhibition, is a cognitive process – and, more specifically, an executive function – that permits an individual to inhibit their impulses and natural, habitual, or dominant behavioral responses to stimuli (a.k.a. prepotent responses) in order to select a more appropriate behavior that is consistent with completing their goals. Self-control is an important aspect of inhibitory control. For example, successfully suppressing the natural behavioral response to eat cake when one is craving it while dieting requires the use of inhibitory control.

The prefrontal cortex, caudate nucleus, and subthalamic nucleus are known to regulate inhibitory control cognition. Inhibitory control is impaired in both addiction and attention deficit hyperactivity disorder. In healthy adults and ADHD individuals, inhibitory control improves over the short term with low (therapeutic) doses of methylphenidate or amphetamine. Inhibitory control may also be improved over the long-term via consistent aerobic exercise.

== Neurophysiology ==
Cortical areas of the brain are frequently involved in inhibitory control. In the frontal lobe, the dorsolateral prefrontal cortex and the right ventral prefrontal cortex show high levels of activity during inhibitory control tests. The middle and inferior frontal gyri, along with the frontal limbic area, have also been associated with response inhibition.

== Tests ==
An inhibitory control test is a neuropsychological test that measures an individual's ability to override their natural, habitual, or dominant behavioral response to a stimulus in order to implement more adaptive goal-oriented behaviors. Some of the neuropsychological tests that measure inhibitory control include the Stroop task, go/no-go task, Simon task, Flanker task, antisaccade tasks, delay of gratification tasks, and stop-signal tasks.

== Gender differences ==
Females tend to have a greater basal capacity to exert inhibitory control over undesired or habitual behaviors and respond differently to modulatory environmental contextual factors relative to males. For example, listening to music tends to significantly improve the rate of response inhibition in females, but reduces the rate of response inhibition in males.

== See also ==
- Discipline#Self-discipline
- Neurobiological effects of physical exercise#Cognitive control and memory
- Inhibition of return
