= Interference theory =

Theory regarding human memory

The interference theory is a theory regarding human memory. Interference occurs in learning. The notion is that memories encoded in long-term memory (LTM) are forgotten and cannot be retrieved into short-term memory (STM) because either memory could interfere with the other. There is an immense number of encoded memories within the storage of LTM. The challenge for memory retrieval is recalling the specific memory and working in the temporary workspace provided in STM. Retaining information regarding the relevant time of encoding memories into LTM influences interference strength. There are two types of interference effects: proactive and retroactive interference.

== History ==
John A. Bergström is credited with conducting the first study regarding interference in 1892. His experiment was similar to the Stroop task and required subjects to sort two decks of cards with words into two piles. When the location was changed for the second pile, sorting was slower, demonstrating that the first set of sorting rules interfered with learning the new set. German psychologists continued in the field with Georg Elias Müller and Pilzecker in 1900 studying retroactive interference. To the confusion of Americans at a later date, Müller used "associative Hemmung" (inhibition) as a blanket term for retroactive and proactive inhibition.

The next major advancement came from American psychologist Benton J. Underwood in 1957. Underwood revisited the classic Ebbinghaus learning curve and found that most of the forgetting was due to interference from previously learned materials.

In 1924, John G. Jenkins and Karl Dallenbach showed that everyday experiences can interfere with memory, employing an experiment that showed that retention was better throughout sleep than over the same amount of time devoted to the activity. The United States again made headway in 1932 with John A. McGeoch suggesting that decay theory should be replaced by an interference theory. The most recent major paradigm shift came when Underwood proposed that proactive inhibition is more important or meaningful than retroactive inhibition in accounting for forgetting.

== Proactive interference ==
Proactive interference is the interference of older memories with the retrieval of newer memories. Of the two effects of interference theory, proactive interference is the less common and less problematic type of interference compared to retroactive interference. Previously, it had been hypothesized that forgetting working memories would be nonexistent if not for proactive interference.

=== Context ===
Proactive interference build-up occurs with memories being learned in similar contexts. A common example is observing previous motor abilities from one skill interfering with a new set of motor abilities being learned in another skill from the initial. Proactive interference is also associated with poorer list discrimination, which occurs when participants are asked to judge whether an item has appeared on a previously learned list. If the items or pairs to be learned are conceptually related to one another, then proactive interference has a greater effect. Delos Wickens discovered that proactive interference build-up is released when there is a change to the category of items being learned, leading to increased processing in STM. Presenting new skills later in practice can considerably reduce proactive interference desirable for participants to have the best opportunity to encode fresh new memories into LTM.

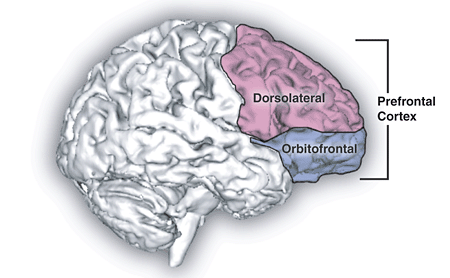
Prefrontal cortex

=== Brain structures ===
The leading experimental technique for studying proactive interference in the brain is the "recent-probes" task. Initially, this is when participants must commit a set of items to memory. They then ask them to recall a specific item. Assessing them is shown by a probe. Thus, using recent-probes task and fMRIs, the brain mechanisms involved in resolving proactive interference identify as the ventrolateral prefrontal cortex and the left anterior prefrontal cortex.

=== Research ===
==== With lists ====
Researchers have studied the joint influence of proactive and retroactive interference using a list of items to be remembered. As expected, the recall was hampered by increasing the number of items in a given list. Proactive interference also affected learning when dealing with multiple lists. Researchers had participants learn a list of ten paired adjectives. The experimenters would consider a list to be learned if the participant could correctly recall eight of the ten items. After two days, participants could recall close to 70% of the items. However, those asked to memorize a new list the day after learning the first one had a recall of only 40%. Those who learned a third list recalled 25% of the items. Therefore, proactive interference affected the correct recall of the last list learned, because of the previous one, or two. In terms of forgetting, the effect of proactive interference was supported by further studies using different methods. The effect of proactive interference was reduced when the test was immediate and when the new target list was different from the previously learned lists.

==== Span performance ====
Span performance refers to working memory capacity. It is hypothesized that span performance is limited in language comprehension, problem-solving, and memory. Proactive Interference affects susceptibility to span performance limitations, as span performance in later experimental trials were worse than performance in earlier trials. With single tasks, proactive interference had less effect on participants with high working memory spans than those with low ones. With dual tasks, both types were similarly susceptible.

To differ, others have tried to investigate the relation of proactive interference when cued to forget. Turvey and Wittlinger designed an experiment to examine the effects of cues such as "not to remember" and "not to recall" with currently learned material. While "not to remember" had a significant effect in reducing proactive interference, cued to "not to recall" previously encoded and stored information did not significantly reduce the effect. Therefore, these associated cues do not directly control the potential effect of proactive interference on short-term memory span.

Proactive interference has shown an effect during the learning phase in terms of stimuli at the acquisition and retrieval stages with behavioral tasks for humans, as found by Castro, Ortega, and Matute. With 106 participants, they investigated two main questions: if two cues are learned as predictors of the same outcome (one after the other), would the second-cue outcome association be retarded? And secondly, once the second association is fully learned, will there still be an effect on subsequent trials? The research, as predicted, showed retardation and impairment in associations, due to the effect of Proactive Interference.

== Retroactive interference ==
Retroactive interference, also known as Retroactive inhibition, is the interference of newer memories with the retrieval of older memories. In other words, subsequently learned memories directly contributes to the forgetting of previously learned memories. The effect of retroactive interference takes place when any type of skill has not been rehearsed over long periods. Of the two effects of interference theory, retroactive interference is considered the more common and more problematic type of interference compared to proactive interference.

RI is a classic paradigm that was first officially termed by Muller. These memory research pioneers demonstrated that filling the retention interval (defined as the amount of time that occurs between the initial learning stage and the memory recall stage) with tasks and material caused significant interference effects with the primary learned items.

As compared to proactive interference, retroactive interference may have larger effects because there is not only competition involved but also unlearning.

=== Iconic research ===
==== Modified (free) recall ====
Briggs's (1954) study modeled McGeoch's work on interference by setting the stage for a classic design of retroactive interference. In his study, participants were asked to learn 12 paired associates to a criterion of 100%. To ensure parsimony, these pairs can be labeled as A_{1}-B_{1}-, A_{2}-B_{2}-...A_{I}-B_{I} (also called AB/AC paradigm). Briggs used a "modified free recall" technique by asking participants to recall an item when cued with B_{I}. Over multiple anticipation trials, participants learned B_{I} items through the prompt of B_{I} items. After perfecting A_{I}- B_{I} learning, participants were given a new list of paired associates to learn; however B_{I} items were replaced with C_{I} items (now given a list of A_{1}-C_{1}-, A_{2}-C_{2}-...A_{I}-C_{I}). As the learning of A_{I}-C_{I} pairs increased, the learning of A_{I}-B_{I} pairs decreased. Eventually recalling the C_{I} items exceeded the recall of the B_{I} items, representing the phenomenon of retroactive interference. A significant part of Briggs's (1954) study was that once participants were tested after a delay of 24 hours the Bi responses spontaneously recovered and exceeded the recall of the Ci items. Briggs explained the spontaneous recovery illustration as an account of A_{I}-B_{I} items competing with A_{I}-C_{I} items or, as McGeoch would define it: "a resultant [of] momentary dominance".

==== Modified modified free recall ====
J.M. Barnes and B.J. Underwood (1959) expanded Briggs's (1954) study by implementing a similar procedure. The main difference in this study, however, was that, unlike Briggs's (1954) "modified free recall" (MFR) task where participants gave one-item responses, Barnes and Underwood asked participants to give both List 1 and List 2 responses to each cued recall task. Participants' ability to recall both items was termed the "modified modified free recall" (MMFR) technique. Equivocally to Briggs's (1954) results, RI occurred when C_{I} recalled responses gradually came to exceed B_{I} responses. Barnes and Underwood argued that because there was "unlimited recall time" to produce multiple-item responses, the fact that A_{I}-C_{I} responses still trumped A_{I}-B_{I} responses represented an account of unlearning.

=== Notable research concepts ===
==== Forgetting ====
Since German psychologist H. Ebbinghaus (1885, 1913) made the first scientific studies on forgetting in the late nineteenth century, further research on the rate of forgetting presented information was found to be steep. While a variety of factors play a role in affecting the rate of forgetting, the general conclusion made is that 70% of originally recalled information is initially forgotten in 24 hours after a session of practice, followed by 80% of information forgotten within 48 hours. Afterwards, forgetting diminishes at a gradual rate, which leaves about 5% to 10% of retained information available for learners to access from practice until the next session. Despite the numbers, retroactive interference can be reduced significantly by implementing over-learning practice schedules, periodic refresh sessions when practicing skills, and skill rehearsal time for the inactive periods of practicing. Continuous skills are more resistant to the rate of forgetting compared to discrete skills, which indicates that the types of skills being practiced and retroactive interference significantly interact with one another.

=== Theories ===
The phenomenon of retroactive interference is highly significant in the study of memory as it has sparked a historical and ongoing debate in regards to whether the process of forgetting is due to the interference of other competing stimuli, or rather the unlearning of the forgotten material. The important conclusion one may gain from RI is that "forgetting is not simply a failure or weakness of the memory system" (Bjork, 1992), but rather an integral part of our stored knowledge repertoire. Although modern cognitive researchers continue to debate the actual causes of forgetting (e.g., competition vs. unlearning), retroactive interference implies a general understanding that additional underlying processes play a role in memory.

==== Competition ====
A standard explanation for the cause of RI is Competition. New associations compete with older associations and the more recent association would win out making it impossible to remember earlier associations. Spontaneous Recovery in MFR supports the claim of competition since after a rest period participants spontaneously remembered original pair associations that they were not able to remember right after the second test.

==== Associative unlearning ====
The associative unlearning hypothesis explains RI by saying that new associations replace the old associations in memory causing the participant to forget the initial associations. Barnes and Underwood argued that A_{I}-C_{I} responses still outnumber A_{I}-B_{I} responses after the delay period supports the Associative Unlearning Hypothesis over Competition.

=== Brain structures ===
Retroactive Interference has been localized to the left anterior ventral prefrontal cortex by magnetoencephalography (MEG) studies investigating Retroactive Interference and working memory in elderly adults. The study found that adults 55–67 years of age showed less magnetic activity in their prefrontal cortices than the control group. Executive control mechanisms are located in the frontal cortex and deficits in working memory show changes in the functioning of this brain area.

=== Research ===
==== Pitch perception ====
Retroactive Interference has also been investigated using pitch perception as the learning medium. The researcher found that the presentation of subsequent stimuli in succession causes a decrease in recalled accuracy. Massaro found that the presentation of successive auditory tones, confused perceptual short-term memory, causing Retroactive Interference as the new tone inhibits the retrieval of previously heard tones.

==== Motor movement ====
Wohldmann, Healey, and Bourne found that Retroactive Interference also affects the retention of motor movements. Researchers found that retroactive interference affects the performance of old motor movements when newly acquired motor movements are practiced. Physical practice of newly executed motor movements decreased the retention and recall of previously learned movements. Despite the retroactive interference noted by Wohldmann et al., researchers noted that mental practice decreased the amount of retroactive interference, suggesting that mental practice is more flexible and durable over time. This study of the superiority effect of physical practice is similar to the Word Superiority Effect made famous by Cattell.

==== Word tasks ====
Retroactive Interference increases when the items are similar, therefore increasing association between them as shown by spreading activation. Barnes and Underwood found that when participants in the experimental condition were presented with two similar word lists, the recollection of the first-word list decreased with the presentation of the second-word list. This finding contrasts the control condition as they had little Retroactive Inference when asked to recall the first-word list after a period of unrelated activity.

== Output interference ==
Output Interference occurs when the initial act of recalling specific information interferes with the retrieval of the original information. An example scenario in which Output Interference might occur would be if one had created a list of items to purchase at a grocery store, but then, neglected to take the list when leaving home. The act of remembering a couple of items on that list decreases the probability of remembering the other items on that list.

=== Research ===
==== Short-term memory ====
Henry L. Roediger III and Schmidt found that the act of retrieval can serve as the source of the failure to remember, using multiple experiments that tested the recall of categorized and paired associative lists. Three experiments were carried out where subjects were first presented with category lists, and then, asked to recall the items in the list after being shown the category name as a cue. The further the test position from the category resulted in a decline of the recall of words. A fourth experiment revealed that only recent items were present in output interference in paired associative lists.

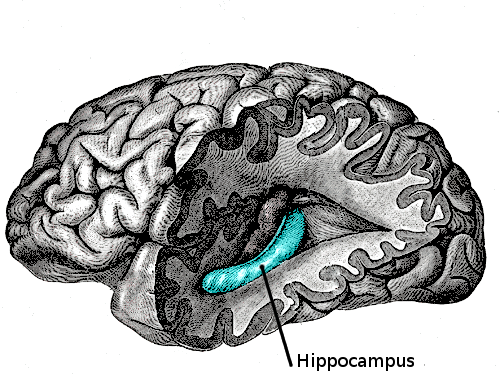
Hippocampus highlighted in blue

Amygdala highlighted in red

==== Long-term memory ====
Smith found that if categories with corresponding items were successfully recalled, a systematic decline would occur when recalling the items in a category across the output sequence. He conducted multiple experiments to determine the input conditioned necessary to produce Output Interference. In his first experiment word recall per category was greater at 60 sec than 30 sec when taking the last input category out to prevent recency effect. In his second experiment he changed the instructions, words used, and nature of the retention test, and showed with the recognition procedure, there was Output Interference but the effect was limited to the first three output positions. Even if retrieving items is necessary for a recall, it is not crucial to performance in a recognition tack. Recall of the organized information from long-term memory hurt the following item recalled. In long-term memory, Smith suggests that Output Interference has effects on extra-core material, which is represented as contextual information, rather than the core material, which is highly available as a result of organization.

==== Effects of age ====
In both short-term memory and long-term memory Smith measured output interference in three age groups (aged 20–39, 40–59, 60–80 years). The results of recall performance revealed significant differences due to age where the older group recalled fewer items than the middle group who recalled fewer items than the youngest group. Overall Smith concluded that memory decline appears with increased age with long-term memory forgetting rather than short-term memory forgetting and short-term memory was unaffected by age. However, output interference was unable to explain the memory deficit seen in older subjects.

Recent research of adults free recall and cognitive triage displayed similar findings of recall performance being poorer in older adults compared to younger adults. Although it was also indicated that older adults had an increased susceptibility to output interference compared to younger adults and the difference increased as additional items were recalled.

== Similar theories ==
=== Decay theory ===
Decay theory outlines that memories weaken over time despite consolidation and storage. This is to say that although you remember a specific detail, over time you may have greater difficulty retrieving the detail you encoded. It has been suggested that the time interval between encoding and retrieval determines the accuracy of recall.

A practical example of decay theory is seen in the financial sector. If you open a bank account and do not deposit or withdraw money from the account, after some time, the bank will render the account dormant. The owner of the account, then, has to reopen the account for it to remain active. The bank account (the memory) is rendered dormant (the memory weakened) over time if there is no activity on the account (if the memory is not retrieved after some time).

==== Similarities ====
Decay theory is similar to interference theory in the way that old memories are lost over time. Memories are lost in Decay Theory by the passing of time. In Interference Theory, memories are lost due to newly acquired memories. Both Decay and Interference Theories are involved in psychological theories of forgetting.

==== Differences ====
Decay and interference theory differ in that Interference Theory has a second stimulus that impedes the retrieval of the first stimulus. Decay Theory is caused by time itself. Decay Theory is a passive method of forgetting as no interference is produced. Interference Theory is an active process because the act of learning new information directly impedes the recollection of previously stored information.

=== Dual task interference ===
Dual-task interference is a kind of interference that occurs when two tasks are attempted simultaneously. Harold Pashler wrote a paper summing up the theoretical approaches to dual-task interference. The basis of his research looked at when one attempts two or more tasks at the same time, why in some cases is one successful in completing their task and in other cases not.

==== Capacity sharing ====
Pashler proposed that the brain contains one mental entity where all tasks must be carried out. A real-life example of this could be going to the dentist; the only place to have cavities filled is at a dentist's office. When the brain is attempting to complete two tasks, both tasks are present in the same mind area and compete for processing ability and speed. This relates to interference theory as the tasks compete. Interference theory says that the learning of new information decreases the retrieval of older information, and this is true for dual-task interference. The dominant task of the two inhibits the other task from completion. It is presumed that the dominant task would be a new task as a previously accomplished task would already be stored in memory. The new task would, then, be completed successfully as more mental effort is required to complete a novel task, and the previously completed task would not be completed as the new task dominated the mental capacity. Just as Interference Theory states, the completion of new tasks inhibits the completion of previously completed tasks due to capacity sharing.

==== Cross talk models ====
Cross-talk is the communication between sensory inputs, processing, and the thoughts of the individual. The theory is that if two processes are being activated, and they are not similar in any way (making cookies and going on vacation), the brain will be confused as separate cognitive areas are being activated, and there is conflicting communication between the two. Contrastingly, if the two processes are similar (making cookies and pouring milk), there will be less crosstalk and more productive and uninterrupted cognitive processing.

Crosstalk is used by engineers to discuss the degradation of communication channels due to context dependence.

Navon and Miller claim that Dual-Task Interference is caused by an outcome conflict, which is a result of one task producing, "outputs, throughputs, or side effects that are harmful to the processing of the [other task]". This is the concept of Interference Theory. The thoughts, outputs, and side effects of one task either affect the previous or subsequent recall.

== Neurobiology ==
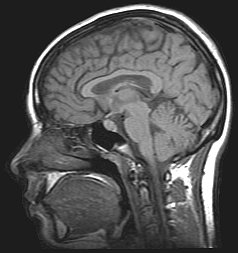
MRI of a human brain

=== Event-related fMRI studies ===
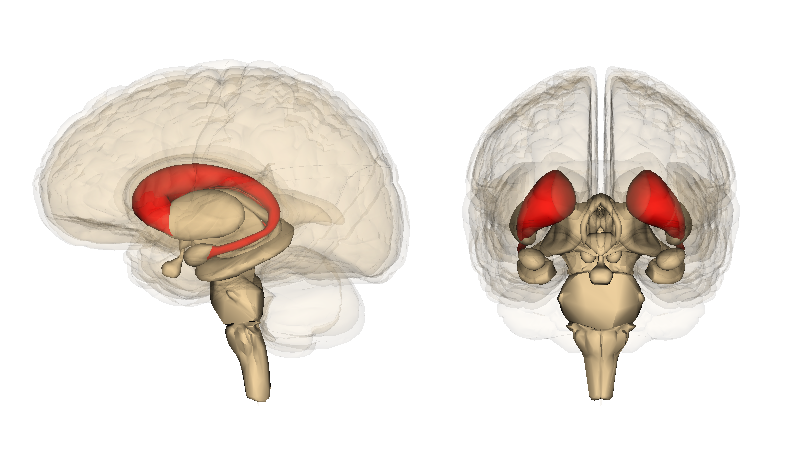
Caudate Nucleus highlighted in red

==== Stroop and Simon task ====
The performance of Stroop and Simon tasks were monitored on 10 healthy young adults using magnetic resonance image (MRI) scanning. Functional images were acquired at specific time intervals during each subject's scan. Brain activation during the Stroop and Simon task was remarkably similar including anterior cingulate, supplementary motor cortex, visual association cortex, inferior temporal cortex, inferior parietal cortex, inferior frontal cortex, dorsolateral prefrontal cortex, and caudate nuclei. Interference effects in the Stroop and Simon tasks activate similar brain regions at similar time distributions.

== Application ==
=== Advertising ===
It has been demonstrated that recall will be lower when consumers have afterward seen an ad for a competing brand in the same product class. Exposure to later similar advertisements does not cause interference for consumers when brands are rated on purchasing likelihood. This shows that information processing objective can moderate the effects of interference of competitive advertising. Competitive brand advertising not only interferes with consumer recall of advertising in the past but also interferes with learning new distinctive brand information in the future.

==== Reducing competitive ad interference ====
Repetition improves brand name recall when presented alone. When competitive advertising was presented, it was shown that repetition provided no improvement in brand name recall over a single exposure. The competitive ads interfered with the added learning from repetition. However, when the target brand name was shown using varying ad executions interference was reduced. Presenting ads in multi-modalities (visual, auditory) will reduce possible interference because there are more associations or paths to cue recall than if only one modality had been used. This is the principle of multimedia learning. Also, interference is increased when competing ads are presented in the same modality. Therefore, by presenting ads in multiple modalities, the chance that the target brand has unique cues is increased.

== See also ==
- Neuroimaging
- Working memory
- Memory inhibition
- Memory conformity
- Einstellung effect
- Language transfer (interference between languages)
- Forgetting curve
- Between-systems memory interference model
