= Delos Wickens =

Delos Donald "Wick" Wickens (October 6, 1909 – April 9, 1988) was an American experimental research psychologist, behaviorist, and author. He taught at Ohio State University from 1946 until his retirement in 1980.

Wickens discovered the release from proactive inhibition through his research on proactive interference buildup. His analysis of human behavior culminated in his work “Encoding Categories of Words; an Empirical Approach to Meaning,” which was published in Psychological Review and remains one of the most widely cited articles in the history of recent psychology. Over the years, Wickens published his research findings predominantly in the Journal of Experimental Psychology and the Bulletin of the Psychometric Society.

== Biography ==
Wickens was born on October 6, 1909, in Rochester, New York. He received a BA from Centre College in 1931 followed by an MA in English literature and a PhD in Psychology at the University of North Carolina in 1933. While a graduate student, “Wick,” as he was called by his friends, was employed part-time taking care of laboratory research animals for the Psychology Department, which contributed to his fascination with animal research and the experimental approach toward understanding human and animal behavior. He was married to Carol Dow Wickens, who often helped him with his research, until her death in 1982.

Over the years he received a number of honors and awards. These included the American Psychological Foundation’s Distinguished Teaching Award, the highly prestigious Warren Medal from the Society of Experimental Psychologists, a Distinguished Alumni Award from the University of North Carolina, and a Distinguished Research Award from Ohio State University. He was a prolific writer, authoring or coauthoring over 100 experimental or theoretical articles, contributing the section on classical conditioning to the Encyclopedia of Psychology, and was associate editor of the Journal of Experimental Psychology from 1966 to 1973. It is estimated that during his 35 years at OSU he helped over 1,000 graduate students from all fields of psychology, and 79 psychologists completed their PhDs under his direction.

Wick died in his sleep on April 9, 1988, in Champaign-Urbana, Illinois. He is survived by two sons, both professors of psychology: Christopher, University of Illinois at Urbana–Champaign, and Thomas, University of California at Los Angeles.

== Early research ==
During his career, Wickens authored or coauthored over 100 published articles. These varied in nature from experimental to theoretical. In his early career, Wickens focused on classical conditioning. In 1938 he authored several articles about the transference of conditioned excitation and conditioned inhibition in muscle groups, emphasizing the functional rather than muscular character of the conditioned response. For the next few decades, Wickens continued to focus on stimuli and responses, though generalization and perceptual factors were increasingly considered. For the next few decades, Wickens continued to focus on stimuli and responses, though generalization and perceptual factors were increasingly considered. Later in his career, Wickens explored the development of verbal learning and memory research. With his graduate student, Jack Newton, Wickens observed retroactive interference, the occurrence of recent information interfering with past information, in an A-B/C-D paradigm, sometimes referred to as the Wickens paradigm or PI paradigm. Wickens continued to explore the concept of retroactive interference until prompted by the research of David Born and Charles Allen concerning proactive interference, the occurrence of past information interfering with recent information. In 1971, he coauthored an article with Judith Goggin on the interplay of proactive inhibition, short-term memory, and bilingual abilities. Continuing his interest in proactive interference, Wickens studied proactive interference buildup, demonstrating semantic coding in short term memory.

== Release from proactive inhibition ==
Wickens's research led him to discover the “release from proactive inhibition.” When consecutive trials involve items from the same conceptual category, there was decreased processing of short-term memory. However, Wickens showed that when subjects perceive a change in the category of the item to be remembered, there was increased processing of short-term memory. Wickens then used “release from proactive inhibition” as a technique in research involving semantic relatedness of words. His 1972 Psychological Review article, “Encoding Categories of Words; an Empirical Approach to Meaning,” is currently one of the most widely cited articles in the history of recent psychology. In the article, the “release from proactive inhibition” technique is used to investigate the dimension along which words are encoded in short-term memory. If the semantic content is changed in a consecutive series, a considerable amount of release from proactive inhibition is produced. In the years following this article, Wickens conducted much supporting research. For example, Wickens’ “Lack of Memory for Nonattended Items in Dichotic Listening” illustrates the relationship between “release from proactive inhibition” and semantic coding. The study consisted of 3 different groups of participants: professions, meat, and fruit. Participants in each condition listened to 3 words, counted backwards for 15 seconds, and then attempted to recall the words. Wickens repeated 4 trials with different words in each trial. The results found that the second and third trials decreased in accuracy due to the build up of proactive interference. The fourth trial, however, increased in accuracy after release from the profession and meat conditions. The release from proactive inhibition depended on the words’ categories (profession, fruit, and meat). Proactive inhibition was reduced when the item presented on a subsequent trial was drawn from a different condition. In other words, the release from proactive inhibition depended on the words’ categories (profession, fruit, and meat). The results demonstrate the operation of semantic coding in short term memory.

== Influence ==
While Wickens continued to study the release from proactive inhibition, his interests shifted some to other applications in his later career. He found a connection between memory in conditioning and proactive interference. Using alternately cat or humans, he investigated classical conditioning in light of proactive interference. He found evidence of retention of the conditioned response even in the midst of several kinds of interference and transfer of the conditioned response from the original setting to others. Context of conditioning was further examined, showing transference even after variance of stimuli tone or light. He applied interference to memory theory, researching retrieval, memory set size, and working memory. Wickens also investigated semantic memory, testing new proposed dimensions for semantic space and working off of some of his earlier work. His articles and ideas still inform many psychologists who investigate interference. Lustig, May, and Hasher’s article “Working Memory Span and the Role of Proactive Interference” cites Wickens no less than three times.
