= Charles W. Eriksen =

American psychologist (1923–2018)

Charles Walter Eriksen (February 4, 1923 – February 16, 2018) was an American psychologist who was the editor of Perception & Psychophysics from 1971 to 1993. Eriksen was a leading academic psychologist researching the field of visual perception. He developed the Eriksen flanker task.

== Early life ==
Eriksen's early life was spent in Omaha, Nebraska. He was keen on fishing, and pranks. He studied at the University of Nebraska, and did a PhD in clinical psychology at Stanford University because the queue for psychology was shorter than the one for physics. His first job in 1950 was at Johns Hopkins University as a clinician and experimenter doing two part times jobs.

== Perception ==
Eriksen's publication of the flanker test has been heavily cited.
