= Memory inhibition =

Term in psychology

In psychology, memory inhibition is the ability not to remember irrelevant information. The scientific concept of memory inhibition should not be confused with everyday uses of the word "inhibition". Scientifically speaking, memory inhibition is a type of cognitive inhibition, which is the stopping or overriding of a mental process, in whole or in part, with or without intention.

Memory inhibition is a critical component of an effective memory system. While some memories are retained for a lifetime, most memories are forgotten. According to evolutionary psychologists, forgetting is adaptive because it facilitates selectivity of rapid, efficient recollection. For example, a person trying to remember where they parked their car would not want to remember every place they have ever parked. In order to remember something, therefore, it is essential not only to activate the relevant information, but also to inhibit irrelevant information.

There are many memory phenomena that seem to involve inhibition, although there is often debate about the distinction between interference and inhibition.

== History ==
In the early days of psychology, the concept of inhibition was prevalent and influential (e.g., Breese, 1899; Pillsbury, 1908; Wundt, 1902). These psychologists applied the concept of inhibition (and interference) to early theories of learning and forgetting. Starting in 1894, German scientists Muller and Shumann conducted empirical studies that demonstrated how learning a second list of items interfered with memory of the first list. Based on these experiments, Muller argued that the process of attention was based on facilitation. Arguing for a different explanation, Wundt (1902) claimed that selective attention was accomplished by the active inhibition of unattended information, and that to attend to one of several simultaneous stimuli, the others had to be inhibited. American Psychologist Walter Pillsbury combined Muller and Wundt's arguments, claiming that attention both facilitates information that is wanted and inhibits information that is unwanted.

In the face of behaviorism during the late 1920s through the 1950s, and through the early growth of cognitive psychology in the late 1950s and early 1960s, inhibition largely disappeared as a theory. Instead, classical interference theory dominated memory research until as late as 1960. By the early 1970s, however, classical interference theory began to decline due to its reliance on associationism, its inability to explain the facts of interference or how interference applies to everyday life, and to newly published reports on proactive and retroactive inhibition.

Since the mid-1980s, there has been a renewed interest in understanding the role of inhibition in cognition. Research on a wide variety of psychological processes, including attention, perception, learning and memory, psycholinguistics, cognitive development, aging, learning disabilities, and neuropsychology, suggests that resistance to interference (which implies capacity for inhibition) is an important part of cognition.

More recently, researchers suggest that the hippocampus plays a role in the regulation of disliked and competing memories, and fMRI studies have shown hippocampus activity during inhibition processes.

== Empirical research ==
=== Part-set cuing effect ===
The "part-set cuing effect" was initially discovered by Slamecka (1968), who found that providing a portion of to-be-remembered items as test cues often impairs retrieval of the remaining un-cued items compared with performance in a no-cue (free-recall) control condition. Such an effect is intriguing because normally cues are expected to aid recall (e.g., Tulving & Pearlstone, 1966). A prominent figure in retrieval-based inhibition research, Henry L. Roediger III was another one of the first psychologists to propose the idea that retrieving an item reduces the subsequent accessibility of other stored items. Becoming aware of the part-set cueing effect reduces the effect, such that relearning part of a set of previously learned associations can improve recall of the non-relearned associations.

=== Hasher and Zacks' inhibition account of aging ===
Using inhibition to explain memory processes began with the work of Hasher and Zacks (1988), which focused on the cognitive costs associated with aging and bridging the attention-memory gap. Hasher and Zacks found that older adults show impairments on tasks that require inhibiting irrelevant information in working memory, and these impairments may lead to problems in a variety of contexts.

=== Retrieval-induced forgetting ===
Anderson and Spellman's model of retrieval-induced forgetting suggests that when items compete during retrieval, an inhibitory process will serve to suppress those competitors. For instance, retrieval of one meaning for a word (e.g. the verb meaning of the word sock) will tend to inhibit the dominant meaning of that word (e.g. the noun meaning of sock). In 1995, Anderson and Spellman conducted a three-phase study using their retrieval-induced forgetting model to demonstrate unlearning as inhibition.

- Study phase: Participants study a list of category-exemplar pairings where some exemplars are semantically similar in that they belong to another category besides the one they are explicitly paired with (e.g. Food-Cracker, Food-Strawberry, Red-Tomato, Red-Blood).
- Retrieval-practice phase: Participants are cued to practice remembering some of the exemplars given the category cue (e.g. Red-Bl__).
- Test phase: Given each category as a cue, the participant tries to recall the exemplar (e.g. Food-C__, Food-S__, Red-T__, Red-Bl__).

Anderson and Spellman observed that items that shared a semantic relationship with practiced information was less recallable. Using the example from above, recall of items related to practiced information, including tomato and strawberry was lower than recall for cracker, even though strawberry is part of a different pair. This finding suggests that associative competition by explicit category cue is not the only factor in retrieval difficulty. They theorized that the brain suppresses, or inhibits, non-practiced attributes. This explains why an item that is very similar to tomato, but not from the same pair, also exhibits decreased recall rate.

=== "Think/no-think" paradigm and intentional inhibition ===
During the recovered memory debate of the 1990s, cognitive psychologists were dubious about whether specific memories could be repressed. One stumbling block was that repression had not been demonstrated in a research study. In 2001, researchers Anderson and Green claimed to have found laboratory evidence of suppression. They trained their participants with a list of unrelated word pairs (such as ordeal-roach), so they could respond with the second member of the pair (roach) when they saw the other member (ordeal). The more frequently participants had tried to not think about a particular word, the less likely they were to retrieve it on a final memory test. This impairment even occurred when participants were given an "independent probe" test, i.e. given a similar category (insect) instead of the original cue (roach), and asked to fill in the blank on the memory test: insect-r_____. According to Anderson and Green, the fact that participants had a decreased ability to recall items they were told to forget strongly supports the existence of an inhibitory control mechanism and the idea that people have the ability to suppress unwanted memories.

Though Anderson & Green's (2001) results have been replicated several times, a group of prominent psychology researchers using the same methodology as the original study were unable to replicate even the basic result (Bulevich, Roediger, Balota, & Butler, 2006). They determined that suppression is not a robust experimental phenomenon in the think/no-think paradigm and suggested that Anderson and Green's findings could be explained by retroactive interference, or simply thinking about X when told to "not think" about Y.

== Amnesia for trauma or abuse ==
Amnesia, the forgetting of important personal information, usually occurs because of disease or injury to the brain, while psychogenic amnesia, which involves a loss of personal identity and has psychological causes, is rare. Nonetheless, a range of studies have concluded that at least 10% of physical and sexual abuse victims forget the abuse. Some studies claim that the rate of delayed recall of many forms of traumatic experiences (including natural disasters, kidnapping, torture and more) averages among studies at approximately 15%, with the highest rates resulting from child sexual abuse, military combat, and witnessing a family member murdered. A 1996 interview survey of 711 women reported that forgetting and later remembering childhood sexual abuse is not uncommon; more than a quarter of the respondents who reported abuse also reported forgetting the abuse for some period of time and then recalling it on their own. Of those who reported abuse, less than 2% reported that the recall of the abuse was assisted by a therapist or other professional. Other studies show that people who have experienced trauma usually remember it, not forget it. McNally (2001) found that women who report having either repressed or recovered memories of childhood sexual abuse have no worse memory for trauma cue words than women who have never been sexually abused. Similarly, McNally (1998) found that women who were sexually abused as children and who developed PTSD as a result of their abuse will not have any more trouble recalling trauma related words than healthy adult survivors of childhood sexual abuse or women who were never abused as children.

Although the rate of recall of previously forgotten traumatic events was shown by Elliot and Briere (1996) to be unaffected by whether or not the victim had a history of being in psychotherapy, individuals who report repressed memories are more susceptible to producing false memories than individuals who could always recall the memory. Williams found that among women with confirmed histories of sexual abuse, approximately 38% did not recall the abuse 17 years later, especially when it was perpetrated by someone familiar to them. Hopper cites several studies which indicate that some abuse victims will have intervals of complete amnesia for their abuse. Peer-reviewed and clinical studies have documented the existence of recovered memory; one website lists 43 legal cases where an individual whose claim to have recovered a repressed memory has been accepted by a court. Traumatic amnesia, which allegedly involves the forgetting of specific traumatic events for long periods of time, is highly controversial, as is repression, the psychodynamic explanation of traumatic amnesia. Because these concepts lack good empirical support, psychological scientists are skeptical about the validity of "recovered memories", and argue that some therapists, through suggestive techniques, have (un)knowingly encouraged false memories of victimization.

== Evidence against ==
The idea that subjects can actively inhibit a memory has many critics. MacLeod (2003) challenged the idea of inhibition in cognitive control, arguing that inhibition can be attributed to conflict resolution, which is the error-prone act of choosing between two similar values that do not necessarily have the same pair. Re-examine the pairs from above: Food-Cracker, Food-Strawberry, Red-Tomato, and Red-Blood. Memory inhibition theories suggest that recall of strawberry decreases when recall of tomato decreases because tomato's attributes are inhibited when red-blood is learned. MacLeod argues that inhibition does not take place, but instead is the result of confusion between similar word-pairs like food-tomato and red-strawberry that can lead to errors. This is different from tomato's attributes being inhibited. "In most cases where inhibitory mechanisms have been offered to explain cognitive performance", explains MacLeod, "non-inhibitory mechanisms can accomplish the same goal" (p. 203).

== See also ==
- Emotion and memory
- Interference theory
