= Eriksen flanker task =

Set of tests in cognitive psychology

In cognitive psychology, the Eriksen flanker task is a set of response inhibition tests used to assess the ability to suppress responses that are inappropriate in a particular context. The target is flanked by non-target stimuli which correspond either to the same directional response as the target (congruent flankers), to the opposite response (incongruent flankers), or to neither (neutral flankers). The task is named for American psychologists Barbara A. Eriksen & Charles W. Eriksen, who first published the task in 1974, and for the flanker stimuli that surround the target. In the tests, a directional response (usually left or right) is assigned to a central target stimulus. Various forms of the task are used to measure information processing and selective attention.

== Procedure and method ==
In an Eriksen Flanker Task there are three types of stimuli used:

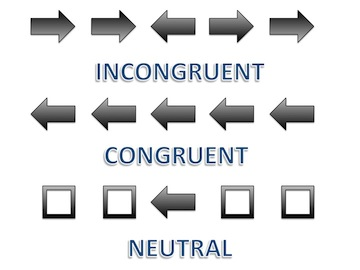
Incongruent, congruent, and neutral stimuli represented by arrows. This is what a participant may see in a standard Eriksen Flanker Task

1. Congruent stimulus- Flankers call for the same response as the target, and may appear identical. Also referred to as the compatible condition.
2. Incongruent stimulus- Flanker items call for the opposite response of the target and are represented by different symbols. Also referred to as the incompatible condition.
3. Neutral stimulus- Flanker items neither call for the same response nor evoke response conflict.

In the original test described by Eriksen and Eriksen in 1974, letter stimuli were used. Subjects were instructed to make directional responses to certain letters, for example a right response could be associated to the letters H and K, and a left response to S and C. Each stimulus consisted of a set of seven letters, with the target stimulus placed in the central position. Examples of congruent stimuli would be HHHKHHH and CCCSCCC, where both the target stimulus and the flankers correspond to the same directional response. Examples of incongruent stimuli could be HHHSHHH and CCCHCCC , where the central target letter and the flankers correspond to opposite directional responses. Choice reaction times (CRTs or RTs) were then recorded and compared between congruent and incongruent conditions.

Other variants of the Eriksen Flanker Task have used numbers, color patches, or arrows as stimuli. Also, although most Eriksen Flanker Tasks show the flankers on the left and right of the target, they can also be placed above or below the target, or in other spatial orientations. These examples all use an arbitrary mapping between the stimulus and the response. Another possibility is to use a natural mapping, with arrows as stimuli. For example, Kopp et al. (1994) used left and right arrows, with flanker stimuli above and below the target. The flankers could be arrows pointing in the same direction as the target (congruent) the opposite direction (incongruent) or squares (neutral). More commonly, flankers have been arranged in a horizontal array, as with letter stimuli, so <<<<< would be a congruent stimulus, <<><< an incongruent stimulus.

== Neurological basis ==
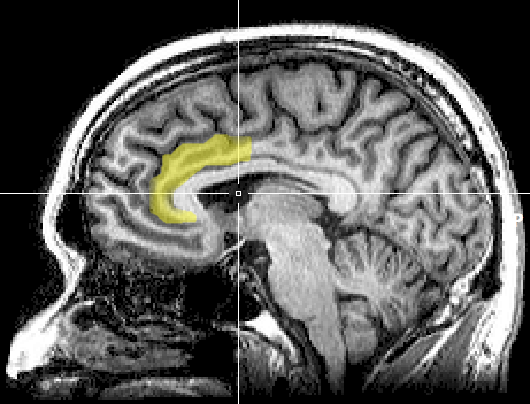
The Anterior Cingulate Cortex (ACC) is highlighted in yellow

When subjects participate in the Eriksen Flanker Task, the anterior cingulate cortex, or the ACC, is activated. The ACC is a frontal brain structure responsible for a wide variety of autonomic functions. It is observed to be more active in response to processing incongruent stimuli than congruent stimuli. It is believed that the ACC may monitor the amount of conflict in an Eriksen Flanker trial. Then, that measured conflict is used to enhance the amount of control the participant has on the next trial, thus indicating that the more conflict presented on trial n, the more control expressed on trial n + 1.

This process leads to an interaction called the Gratton effect, which is the finding of a lower interference effect after an incongruent trial compared to the effect after a congruent trial. On this first trial (trial n) the incongruent stimulus presented will lead to an increase in conflict detected by the ACC. On trial n + 1, the increased conflict will lead to more control, causing the distracting, or flanker, stimuli to be more readily ignored.

== Experimental findings ==
The flanker paradigm was originally introduced as a way of studying the cognitive processes involved in detection and recognition of targets in the presence of distracting information, or "noise". The 1974 study found that CRT was significantly greater in incompatible than compatible conditions, a difference termed the flanker effect.

Earlier work had used visual search, but because these tasks involve an active scan of the environment to identify the target stimulus, this experimental design made it difficult to separate the effects of distraction from the effects of the search process. In the flanker paradigm, the position of the target is always known—there is no search process. Nonetheless interference still occurs, so it can be studied independently of search mechanisms. Eriksen and Schultz (1979) varied a number of features of the flanker tests, for example the size and contrast of the letters, or the use of forward or backward masking. They proposed a continuous flow model of perception in which information is processed in parallel for different stimulus elements, and accumulates over time until sufficient information is available to determine a response.

More recent work in this area has used neurophysiological measures such as event-related potentials or imaging techniques such as fMRI.

=== Effects on performance ===
A variety of factors have been shown to affect subject's performance on flanker tasks. Acute administration of antihistamine or alcohol severely impairs CRT in test measures, a deficit which Ramaekers et al. (1992) found to carry over to driving tests. The study used an on-the-road driving tests, and several laboratory tests including the letter version of the Eriksen task to assess the effects of two antihistamines and alcohol on driving skills. Both alcohol and the antihistamine cetirizine impaired performance in the test measures, and their effects were additive. The non-sedating antihistamine loratadine had no effect on any of the measures studied. The arrow version of the flanker test has also been evaluated as a method of detecting impairment due to alcohol and drugs in drivers at the roadside, demonstrating the importance of selective attention skills to spatial abilities such as vehicle operation.

Various psychiatric and neurological conditions also affect performance on flanker tasks. While subjects with chronic schizophrenia performed similarly to control subjects on flanker tasks of both conditions, acute schizophrenics have a significantly greater RT with incongruent flanker conditions. This indicates the nature of cognitive dysfunction for the latter may involve broadening of selective attention. Studies involving sufferers of Parkinson's disease found similar difficulties with suppressing incorrect response activation due to flanker interference, especially when under speed stress.

Moderate exercise, conversely, has been shown to improve performance on flanker tests, suggesting efficiency of cognitive control operates constructively with physical activity.

Curiously, lowering serotonin levels via acute tryptophan depletion does not affect performance on a flanker task or corresponding EEG readings, but does alter cardiac response to incongruent stimuli, suggesting dissociation between cardiac and electro-cortical responses to errors and feedback when measuring cognitive flexibility.

=== Effect of sequential testing ===
The conflict effect of flanker interference have been well-documented to decrease with repeat testing, especially following incongruent/conflict conditions in what is known as the Gratton Effect. However the precise nature of these sequential dependencies is still subject to speculation; the effect may be stimulus-independent or stimulus-specific, and recent studies suggest the effect is not solely attributable to conflict adaptation but forms of associative priming. Still other research maintains the Gratton effect can be eliminated entirely if sequential biases are removed and that conflict adaptation failed to account for any performance results, suggesting instead support for a congruency switch cost model.

The Gratton effect of conflict adaptation effect is also well documented in studies of event-related brain potentials (ERPs), which typically show reduced activity for high-conflict trials following other high-conflict trials. Notably, after removing confounding alternative explanations of conflict adaptation, conflict adaptation is still observed in ERP indices. An advantage of using ERPs is the ability to examine subtle differences in brain activity that do not appear in behavioral measures, such as response times or error rates.

== Similar conflict tasks ==
There are three different types of conflict tasks that research has been largely focused on, one of these being the Eriksen Flanker Task. All three of these tasks have mainly been viewed as identical in terms of the control processes that are involved. Due to this, inferences and predictions about one task have been made by theorists based on the published findings in a different task.

Another conflict task that receives significant focus is the Stroop task. In this test, participants are told to name the color of a word as quickly as they can and as accurately as possible. The trick is the word itself refers to a color. The word can either be congruent, which would mean the word would match the font color, such as the word "blue" in blue font color, or it can be incongruent where the word would not match the font color like the word "purple" in yellow font color. Just as with the Eriksen Flanker Task, the response time and accuracy of congruent words is better than those of incongruent words.

The third task that is largely focused on is the Simon or spatial compatibility task. In this task, the stimulus, either a word, letter, or symbol, is shown on the right or left side of the computer screen. The participant is instructed to press the right or left button based on the content of the stimulus rather than its location. A congruent trial, for example, could be the word "left" shown on the left side of the screen, while an incongruent trial might be the word "left" on the right side of the screen.

== See also ==
- Cocktail party effect
- Simon effect
- Stroop effect
