= Decay theory =

Hypothesis about the neurophysiology of memory

The Decay theory is a theory that proposes that memory fades due to the mere passage of time. Information is therefore less available for later retrieval as time passes and memory, as well as memory strength, wears away. When an individual learns something new, a neurochemical "memory trace" is created. However, over time this trace slowly disintegrates. Actively rehearsing information is believed to be a major factor counteracting this temporal decline. It is widely believed that neurons die off gradually as we age, yet some older memories can be stronger than most recent memories. Thus, decay theory mostly affects the short-term memory system, meaning that older memories (in long-term memory) are often more resistant to shocks or physical attacks on the brain. It is also thought that the passage of time alone cannot cause forgetting, and that decay theory must also take into account some processes that occur as more time passes.

== History ==

The term "decay theory" was first coined by Edward Thorndike in his book The Psychology of Learning in 1914. This simply states that if a person does not access and use the memory representation they have formed the memory trace will fade or decay over time. This theory was based on the early memory work by Hermann Ebbinghaus in the late 19th century. The decay theory proposed by Thorndike was heavily criticized by McGeoch and his interference theory. This led to the abandoning of the decay theory, until the late 1950s when studies by John Brown and the Petersons showed evidence of time based decay by filling the retention period by counting backwards in threes from a given number. This led to what is known as the Brown–Peterson paradigm. The theory was again challenged, this time a paper by Keppel and Underwood who attributed the findings to proactive interference. Studies in the 1970s by Reitman tried reviving the decay theory by accounting for certain confounds criticized by Keppel and Underwood. Roediger quickly found problems with these studies and their methods. Harris made an attempt to make a case for decay theory by using tones instead of word lists and his results are congruent making a case for decay theory. In addition, McKone used implicit memory tasks as opposed to explicit tasks to address the confound problems. They provided evidence for decay theory, however, the results also interacted with interference effects. One of the biggest criticisms of decay theory is that it cannot be explained as a mechanism and that is the direction that the research is headed.

== Inconsistencies ==
Researchers disagree about whether memories fade as a function of the mere passage of time (as in decay theory) or as a function of interfering succeeding events (as in interference theory). Evidence tends to favor interference-related decay over temporal decay, yet this varies depending on the specific memory system taken into account.

=== Short-term memory ===
Within the short-term memory system, evidence favours an interference theory of forgetting, based on various researchers' manipulation of the amount of time between a participant's retention and recall stages finding little to no effect on how many items they are able to remember. Looking solely at verbal short-term memory within studies that control against participants' use of rehearsal processes, a very small temporal decay effect coupled with a much larger interference decay effect can be found. No evidence for temporal decay in verbal short-term memory has been found in recent studies of serial recall tasks. Regarding the word-length effect in short-term memory, which states that lists of longer word are harder to recall than lists of short words, researchers argue that interference plays a larger role due to articulation duration being confounded with other word characteristics.

=== Working memory ===
Both theories are equally argued in working memory. One situation in which this shows considerable debate is within the complex-span task of working memory, where a complex task is alternated with the encoding of to-be-remembered items. It is either argued that the amount of time taken to perform this task or the amount of interference this task involves cause decay. A time-based resource-sharing model has also been proposed, stating that temporal decay occurs once attention is switched away from whatever information is to be remembered, and occupied by processing of the information. This theory gives more credit to the active rehearsal of information, as refreshing items to be remembered focuses attention back on the information to be remembered in order for it to be better processed and stored in memory. As processing and maintenance are both crucial components of working memory, both of these processes need to be taken into account when determining which theory of forgetting is most valid. Research also suggests that information or an event's salience, or importance, may play a key role. Working memory may decay in proportion to information or an event's salience. This means that if something is more meaningful to an individual, that individual may be less likely to forget it quickly.

=== System interaction ===
These inconsistencies may be found due to the difficulty with conducting experiments that focus solely on the passage of time as a cause of decay, ruling out alternative explanations. However, a close look at the literature regarding decay theory will reveal inconsistencies across several studies and researchers, making it difficult to pinpoint precisely which indeed plays the larger role within the various systems of memory. It could be argued that both temporal decay and interference play an equally important role in forgetting, along with motivated forgetting and retrieval failure theory.

== Future directions ==
Revisions in decay theory are being made in research today. The theory is simple and intuitive, but also problematic. Decay theory has long been rejected as a mechanism of long term forgetting. Now, its place in short term forgetting is being questioned. The simplicity of the theory works against it in that supporting evidence always leaves room for alternative explanations. Researchers have had much difficulty creating experiments that can pinpoint decay as a definitive mechanism of forgetting. Current studies have always been limited in their abilities to establish decay due to confounding evidence such as attention effects or the operation of interference.

=== Hybrid theories ===
The future of decay theory, according to Nairne (2002), should be the development of hybrid theories that incorporate elements of the standard model while also assuming that retrieval cues play an important role in short term memory. By broadening the view of this theory, it will become possible to account for the inconsistencies and problems that have been found with decay to date.

=== Neuronal evidence ===
Another direction of future research is to tie decay theory to sound neurological evidence. As most current evidence for decay leaves room for alternate explanations, studies indicating a neural basis for the idea of decay will give the theory new solid support. Jonides et al. (2008) found neural evidence for decay in tests demonstrating a general decline in activation in posterior regions over a delay period. Though this decline was not found to be strongly related to performance, this evidence is a starting point in making these connections between decay and neural imaging. A model proposed to support decay with neurological evidence places importance on the firing patterns of neurons over time. The neuronal firing patterns that make up the target representation fall out of synchrony over time unless they are reset. The process of resetting the firing patterns can be looked at as rehearsal, and in absence of rehearsal, forgetting occurs. This proposed model needs to be tested further to gain support, and bring firm neurological evidence to the decay theory.
