= Georg Elias Müller =

German experimental psychologist

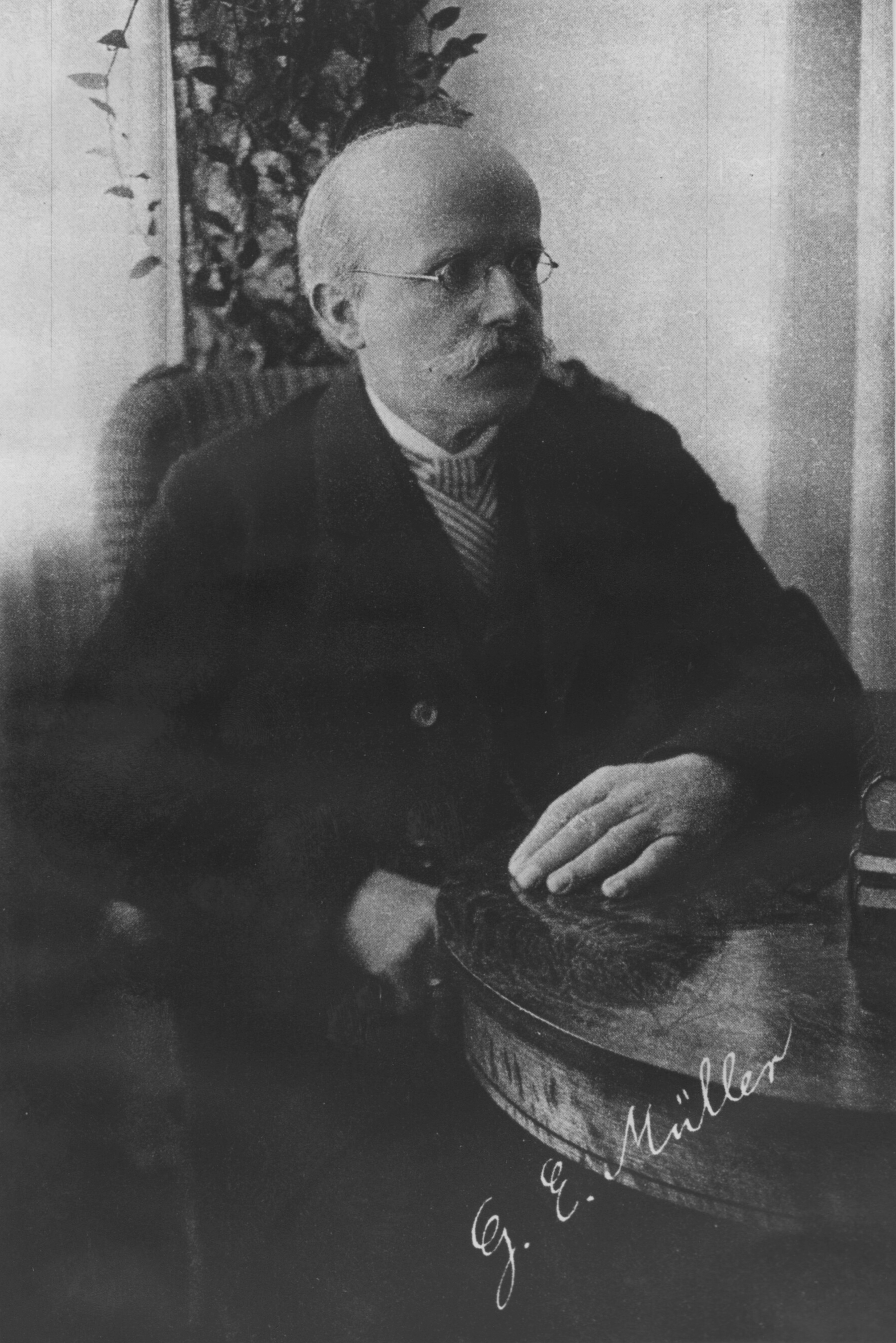
- Georg Elias Müller
- Born: 20 July 1850; Grimma, Kingdom of Saxony, German Confederation
- Died: 23 December 1934 (aged 84); Göttingen, Germany
- Education: Leipzig University; University of Göttingen (Dr.phil., 1873)
- Known for: Psychophysics
- Scientific career
- Fields: Experimental psychology
- Workplaces: University of Göttingen
- Thesis: Zur Theorie der sinnlichen Aufmerksamkeit (On the Theory of Sensory Attention) (1873)
- Doctoral advisor: Hermann Lotze
- Notable students: Nikolay Lossky

Georg Elias Müller (20 July 1850 – 23 December 1934) was a significant early German experimental psychologist who is credited with the theory of retroactive interference.

== Biography ==
=== Early life ===
Georg Elias Müller was born in Grimma, Saxony on 20 July 1850 to August Friedrich Müller and Rosalie Zehme Müller. His father was a theologian and professor of religion at a nearby royal academy. His family was deeply involved in a revivalist orthodoxy (Neuluthertum) that he eventually broke away from. As a child he attended the Gymnasium at Leipzig.

=== Professional biography ===
At 18 he attended Leipzig University where he studied history and philosophy, while there he was inducted into Herbartian Philosophy. He was always seen as studious and had an interest in Mysticism that he fulfilled by reading Goethe, Byron, and Shelley. Müller had difficulty deciding between history or philosophy, in order to make his decision he took two years off from Leipzig. During those two years, starting in 1870 he entered the German army as a volunteer, and took part in the Franco-Prussian War. He decided on philosophy which led him to the study of psychology.

He started out with more of a focus in the humanities and studied philosophy and history. Though Müller does not share much of the same views as Hermann Lotze he credits him with his push towards psychology, research and critical thinking. Gustav Theodor Fechner, his first teacher at Leipzig University also introduced him to psychophysics and another teacher, Moritz Wilhelm Drobisch sent him to the University of Göttingen to study with Lotze and to facilitate his career. Lotze first exposed Müller to scientific psychology.

He completed his doctorate in 1873 under the supervision of Lotze at Göttingen. In April 1881 he succeeded Lotze's position at Göttingen as privatdozent and established one of the first few experimental psychology laboratories in the world. He remained privatdozent for 40 years. Müller was primarily an experimental psychologist, often working in the laboratory and performing rigorous experimental investigations. He was particularly prominent in reaction time research, as well as psychophysics and color theory. He is credited with a portion of the interference theory, retroactive interference, a theory that is still prominent in modern times. While at Göttingen he also lectured on these topics: Psychophysical Method, Memory, and The Phenomena of Violition. Müller also invented the memory drum; a device used for verbal learning research.

Müller's dissertation was on the mechanistic theories of attention. It was not a supported theory but it allowed him to become a faculty member at Göttingen. Once a faculty member of Göttingen, he published Die Grundlegung der Psychophysik ("The Founding of Psychophysics") which helped modify parts of Fechner's work. Also during his early time as faculty at Göttingen he argued for falsification standards for experiments that offered a clear alternative theory. Later on in his career, in what Müller described as the golden years of the Göttingen laboratory, he produced the standard summary on psychophysics (Komplextheorie or sometimes constellation theory). The summary helped Edward Bradford Titchener in his career. The summary was a mechanistic theory of ideation based on Johann Friedrich Herbart's doctrines. In 1903 the Deutsche Gesellschaft für experimentelle Psychologie (German Society of Experimental Psychology) was created and Müller was the head of the society until 1927.

== Works in psychology ==
=== Color phenomena ===
Müller retired in 1922, afterwards he began studying color phenomena. During his study of color phenomena he advanced Ewald Hering's theory of color and elaborated on the two stage theory. The first stage involved the retinal receptors and then the signals were transformed into the four opponent primary colors. In 1930 he wrote two summary books that helped define color theory.

=== Memory ===
Müller's studies were most prominent in memory. He studied indistinct and distinct images effect on memory. He theorized that thinking of indistinct images made memorization and learning more effective. He agreed with the Würzburg school on indistinct images but felt to be better understood, a study of distinct images was needed. Müller did memory research with Gottfried Rückle, a doctorate of mathematics student at Göttingen, who was described as a memory prodigy. His research with Rückle was on his extraordinary memory through the presentation of experimental results on the role of grouping in learning.

Müller and his student Alfons Pilzecker are credited with the term "consolidirung" (consolidation). This terms means that learning doesn't automatically create permanent, consolidated memories, they take time to be permanently learned or consolidated. To test consolidation Müller used nonsense syllables, introduced by Hermann Ebbinghaus, to see how many trials it was needed to learn the nonsense syllables and fully reproduce them. Müller and Pilzecker quantified the amount of learning by measuring the percentage correct. Some of the participants in their experiment said that occasionally the nonsense syllables would come to mind between training sessions even when they were trying to suppress it, they called this perseveration.

==== Retroactive interference ====
Müller formulated and tested the theory of retroactive interference. Retroactive Interference is when learning new material leads to forgetting of previously learned material. Müller and his student Pilzecker studied this by presenting participants with a list of syllables for 6 minutes and then presented three landscape paintings and the participants were asked to describe them. Then the participants were tested on how much they remembered from the list. The control list was presented with no distractions from the landscape paintings and ability to remember what was on the control list was higher than the list followed by the painting description. This supported retroactive interference, the information from the paintings made it more difficult to remember the syllables from the first list.

== Works ==
- Zur Theorie der sinnlichen Aufmerksamkeit ("On the theory of sensory awareness," 1873)
- Zur Grundlegung der Psychophysik ("On foundations for psychophysics," 1878)
- Zur Theorie der Muskelcontraction ("On the theory of muscle contractions," 1891)
- Zur Analyse der Unterschiedsempfindlichkeit, with L. G. Martin ("On the analysis of difference perception," 1899)
- Experimentelle Beiträge zur Lehre vom Gedächtnis, with Pilzecker ("Experimental contributions to the science of memory," 1900)
