= Antisaccade task =

Gross estimation of injury or dysfunction of the frontal lobe

- Purpose: Detect dysfunction of the frontal lobe

The anti-saccade (AS) task is a way of measuring how well the frontal lobe of the brain can control the reflexive saccade, or eye movement. Saccadic eye movement is primarily controlled by the frontal cortex.

== Use ==
=== Research in pathophysiology ===
Saccadic eye movements and anti-saccadic eye movements are carried out by similar regions of the brain: the frontal eye field (FEF), the supplementary motor area (SMA), the thalamus and putamen. Anti-saccades involve two important cognitive functions: the ability to form an intention and the ability to inhibit a reflexive response. It was therefore thought that the dorsolateral prefrontal cortex played a greater role in anti-saccadic movements.

This theory was disproved by O’Driscoll et al. in a study that used positron emission tomography to analyze brain activity during anti-saccadic movement. The study showed that the DLPFC was equally activated in both saccadic and anti-saccadic movements. Anti-saccades required increased activation of the FEF, SMA and putamen.

The anti-saccade task is currently used as a relatively crude or basic assessment of frontal lobe function in patients with neurological or psychiatric disorders. The task has high sensitivity, meaning that it is good at detecting frontal lobe dysfunction. However, its specificity is low, meaning that it can also be positive in patients without frontal lobe dysfunction. Of note, children and adults over the age of 70 will physiologically have an increased rate of error on the anti-saccade task.

=== Psychological research ===
Modified versions of the task, often termed as emotional antisaccade task, have been used in psychological and psychophysiological research to investigate the interaction between visual attention and the processing of emotions. Emotion drives attention: people are usually biased to direct eye movements towards emotional rather than neutral and dull stimuli. The emotional version of the antisaccade task uses emotional stimuli (photographs or conditioned stimuli) as visual targets, requiring participants to look in the opposite direction. Performance in the task is a measure for attentional biases in healthy participants and various disorders such as mood disorders, addiction and social anxiety.

== Procedure ==
To perform the anti-saccade task, an individual is asked to fixate on a motionless target (such as a small dot). A stimulus is then presented to one side of the target. The individual is asked to make a saccade in the direction away from the stimulus. For example, if a stimulus is presented to the left of the motionless target, the patient should look toward the right. Failure to inhibit a reflexive saccade is considered an error.

Neurologic disorders affecting both the frontal cortex or the basal ganglia have shown impaired performance on the anti-saccade task. These include schizophrenia, Huntington's disease, Parkinson's disease, and progressive supranuclear palsy. Additionally, disseminated brain disease such as Alzheimer's disease or AIDS dementia also have an increased number of errors.

== History ==
The anti-saccade test was initially described in 1978 by Peter Hallet when he was a faculty member at the Department of Physiology of the University of Toronto. Many other researchers have used this task, including Guitton et al. and Pierrot-Deseilligny et al. In a well-known study by Guitton et al. (1985), patients with epilepsy who had undergone therapeutic removal of their dorsolateral prefrontal cortex were administered the anti-saccade task. Their performance was compared to healthy controls and patients who had undergone therapeutic removal of their temporal lobes. Results from Guitton's studies showed that only patients with frontal lobe lesions performed abnormally on the AS task.

In contrast, studies by Pierrot-Deseilligny et al. correlated high error rates of AS to specific lesions in the dorsolateral prefrontal cortex (DLPFC). In this study, patients with unilateral infarctions of the posterior parietal lobe were compared against infarctions in 3 frontal regions: the supplementary motor area, frontal eye fields (FEF), and the DLPFC. Only patients with infarctions of the DLPFC showed statistically significant error rates.
