= Simon effect =

Concept regarding reaction time to stimulus

The Simon effect is the difference in accuracy or reaction time between trials in which stimulus and response are on the same side and trials in which they are on opposite sides, with responses being generally slower and less accurate when the stimulus and response are on opposite sides. The task is similar in concept to the Stroop Effect. The Stroop Color and Word Test (SCWT) can be used to assess the ability to inhibit cognitive interference that occurs when the processing of a specific stimulus feature impedes the simultaneous processing of a second stimulus attribute. The Simon effect is an extension of this effect, but the interference in this task is generated by spatial features rather than features of the stimuli themselves.

== Original experiment ==
In J. R. Simon's original study, two lights (the stimulus) were placed on a rotating circular panel. This device would be rotated at varying degrees (away from the horizontal plane). Simon wished to see if an alteration of the spatial relationship, relative to the response keys, affected performance. Age was also a probable factor in reaction time. As predicted, the reaction time of the groups increased based on the relative position of the light stimulus (age was not a factor). The reaction time increased by as much as 30%.

However, what is usually seen as the first genuine demonstration of the effect that became known as the Simon effect is by Simon & Rudell (1967). Here, they had participants respond to the words "left" and "right" that were randomly presented to the left or right ear. Although the auditory location was completely irrelevant to the task, participants showed marked increases in reaction latency if the location of the stimulus was not the same as the required response (if, for example, they were to react left to a word that was presented in the right ear).

== Method ==
A typical demonstration of the Simon effect involves placing a participant in front of a computer monitor and a panel with two buttons. The participant is told that they should press the button on the right when they see something red appear on the screen, and the button on the left when they see something green. Participants are usually told to ignore the location of the stimulus and base their response on the task-relevant color.

Participants typically react faster to red lights that appear on the right hand side of the screen by pressing the button on the right of their panel (congruent trials). Reaction times are typically slower when the red stimulus appears on the left hand side of the screen and the participant must push the button on the right of their panel (incongruent trials). The same, but vice versa, is true for the green stimuli.

This happens despite the fact that the position of the stimulus on the screen relative to the physical position of the buttons on the panel is irrelevant to the task and not correlated with which response is correct. The task, after all, requires the subject to note only the colour of the object (i.e., red or green) by pushing the corresponding button, and not its position on the screen.

== Explanation ==
According to Simon himself, the location of the stimulus, although irrelevant to the task, directly influences response selection due to an automatic tendency to 'react towards the source of the stimulation'. Although other accounts have been suggested, explanations for the Simon effect generally refer back to the interference that occurs in the response-selection stage of decision-making. Neurologically there could be involvement of the dorsolateral prefrontal cortex, as well as the anterior cingulate cortex, which is thought to be responsible for conflict monitoring. The Simon Effect shows that location information cannot be ignored and will affect decision making, even if the participant knows that the information is irrelevant.

Logical argument for response selection:

The challenge in the Simon effect is said to occur during the response selection stage of judgment. This is due to two factors which eliminate the stimulus identification stage and the execution state. In the stimulus identification stage, the participant only needs to be cognitively aware that a stimulus is present. An error would not occur at this stage unless the participant were visually impaired or had some sort of stimulus deficit. As well, an error or delay cannot occur during the execution state because an action has already been decided upon in the previous stage (the response selection stage) and no further decision making takes place (i.e. you cannot make a change to your response without going back to the second stage).

== Practical implications ==
A knowledge of the Simon effect is useful in the design of human-machine interfaces. Aircraft cockpits, for example, require a person to react quickly to a situation. If a pilot is flying a plane and there is a problem with the left engine, an aircraft with a good human-machine interface design would position the indicator light for the left engine to the left of the indicator light for the right engine. This interface would display information in a way that matches the types of responses that people should make. If it were the other way around, the pilot might be more likely to respond incorrectly and adjust the wrong engine.
