= Impulsivity =

Tendency to act on a whim without considering consequences

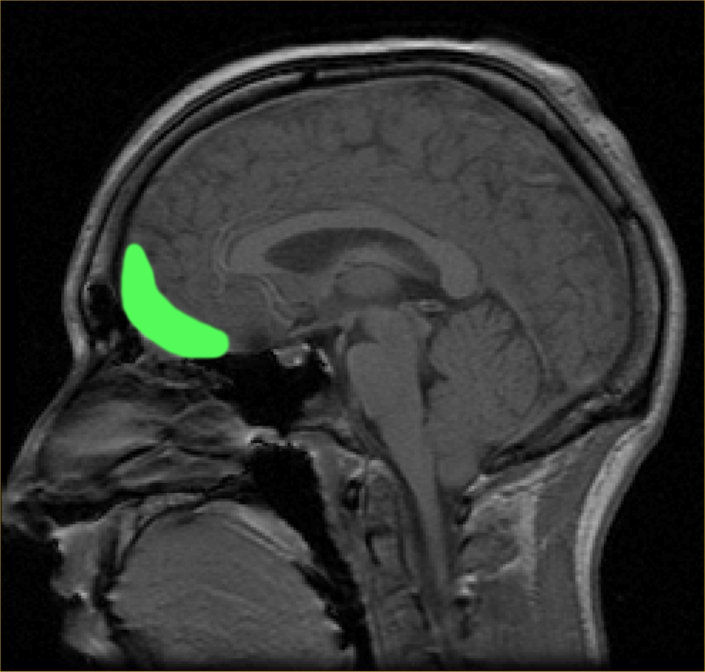
Orbitofrontal cortex, part of the prefrontal cortex that shapes decision-making

In psychology, impulsivity (or impulsiveness) is a tendency to act on a whim, displaying behavior characterized by little or no forethought, reflection, or consideration of the consequences. Impulsive actions are typically "poorly conceived, prematurely expressed, unduly risky, or inappropriate to the situation that often result in undesirable consequences," which imperil long-term goals and strategies for success. Impulsivity can be classified as a multifactorial construct. A functional variety of impulsivity has also been suggested, which involves action without much forethought in appropriate situations that can and does result in desirable consequences. "When such actions have positive outcomes, they tend not to be seen as signs of impulsivity, but as indicators of boldness, quickness, spontaneity, courageousness, or unconventionality." Thus, the construct of impulsivity includes at least two independent components: first, acting without an appropriate amount of deliberation, which may or may not be functional; and second, choosing short-term gains over long-term ones.

Impulsivity is both a facet of personality and a major component of various disorders, including FASD, autism, ADHD, substance use disorders, bipolar disorder, antisocial personality disorder, and borderline personality disorder. Abnormal patterns of impulsivity have also been noted in instances of acquired brain injury and neurodegenerative diseases. Neurobiological findings suggest that there are specific brain regions involved in impulsive behavior, although different brain networks may contribute to different manifestations of impulsivity, and that genetics may play a role.

Many actions contain both impulsive and compulsive features, but impulsivity and compulsivity are functionally distinct. Impulsivity and compulsivity are interrelated in that each exhibits a tendency to act prematurely or without considered thought and often include negative outcomes. Compulsivity may be on a continuum with compulsivity on one end and impulsivity on the other, but research has been contradictory on this point. Compulsivity occurs in response to a perceived risk or threat, impulsivity occurs in response to a perceived immediate gain or benefit, and, whereas compulsivity involves repetitive actions, impulsivity involves unplanned reactions.

Impulsivity is a common feature of the conditions of gambling and alcohol addiction. Research has shown that individuals with either of these addictions discount delayed money (reduce its subjective value to them) at higher rates than those without, and that the presence of gambling and alcohol abuse lead to additive effects on discounting.

== Impulse ==
An impulse is a wish or urge, particularly a sudden one. It can be considered as a normal and fundamental part of human thought processes, but also one that can become problematic, as in a condition like obsessive-compulsive disorder, borderline personality disorder, autism spectrum disorder, attention deficit hyperactivity disorder, or in fetal alcohol spectrum disorders.

The ability to control impulses, or more specifically control the desire to act on them, is an important factor in personality and socialization. Deferred gratification, also known as impulse control, is an example of this, concerning impulses primarily relating to things that a person wants or desires. Delayed gratification comes when one avoids acting on initial impulses. Delayed gratification has been studied in relation to childhood obesity. Resisting the urge to act on impulses is important to teach children, because it teaches the value of delayed gratification.

Many psychological problems are characterized by a loss of control or a lack of control in specific situations. Usually, this lack of control is part of a pattern of behavior that also involves other maladaptive thoughts and actions, such as substance abuse problems or sexual disorders like the paraphilias (e.g. pedophilia and exhibitionism). When loss of control is only a component of a disorder, it usually does not have to be a part of the behavior pattern, and other symptoms must also be present for the diagnosis to be made. (Franklin)

== The five traits that can lead to impulsive actions ==
For many years it was understood that impulsivity was itself a trait, but with further analysis it has been found that there are five distinct traits that can lead to impulsive actions: positive urgency, negative urgency, sensation seeking, lack of planning, and lack of perseverance.

== Associated behavioral and societal problems ==
=== Attention-deficit hyperactivity disorder ===
Attention deficit-hyperactivity disorder (ADHD) is a multiple component disorder involving inattention, impulsivity, and hyperactivity. The Diagnostic and Statistical Manual of Mental Disorders (DSM-IV-TR) breaks ADHD into three subtypes according to the behavioral symptoms: Predominantly Inattentive Type, Predominantly Hyperactive-Impulsive Type, and Combined Type.

Predominantly hyperactive-impulsive type symptoms may include fidgeting and squirming in seats, talking nonstop, dashing around and touching or playing with anything in sight, having trouble sitting still during dinner/school/story time, being constantly in motion, and having difficulty doing quiet tasks or activities.

Other manifestations primarily of impulsivity include being very impatient, having difficulty waiting for things they want or waiting their turns in games, often interrupting conversations or others' activities, or blurting out inappropriate comments, showing their emotions without restraint, and act without regard for consequences.

Prevalence of the disorder worldwide is estimated to be between 4% and 10%, with reports as low as 2.2% and as high as 17.8%. Variation in rate of diagnoses may be attributed to differences between populations (i.e. culture), and differences in diagnostic methodologies. Prevalence of ADHD among females is less than half that of males, and females more commonly fall into the inattentive subtype.

Despite an upward trend in diagnoses of the inattentive subtype of ADHD, impulsivity is commonly considered to be the central feature of ADHD, and the impulsive and combined subtypes are the major contributors to the societal costs associated with ADHD. The estimated cost of illness for a child with ADHD is $14,576 (in 2005 dollars) annually. Prevalence of ADHD among prison populations is significantly higher than that of the normal population.

In both adults and children, ADHD has a high rate of comorbidity with other mental health disorders such as learning disability, conduct disorder, anxiety disorder, major depressive disorder, bipolar disorder, and substance use disorders.

The precise genetic and environmental factors contributing to ADHD are relatively unknown, but endophenotypes offer a potential middle ground between genes and symptoms. ADHD is commonly linked to "core" deficits involving "executive function," "delay aversion," or "activation/arousal" theories that attempt to explain ADHD through its symptomology. Endophenotypes, on the other hand, purport to identify potential behavioral markers that correlate with specific genetic etiology. There is some evidence to support deficits in response inhibition as one such marker. Problems inhibiting prepotent responses are linked with deficits in pre-frontal cortex (PFC) functioning, which is a common dysfunction associated with ADHD and other impulse-control disorders.

Evidence-based psychopharmacological and behavioral interventions exist for ADHD.

=== Substance abuse ===
Impulsivity appears to be linked to all stages of substance abuse.

The acquisition phase of substance abuse involves the escalation from single use to regular use. Impulsivity may be related to the acquisition of substance abuse because of the potential role that instant gratification provided by the substance may offset the larger future benefits of abstaining from the substance, and because people with impaired inhibitory control may not be able to overcome motivating environmental cues, such as peer pressure. "Similarly, individuals that discount the value of delayed reinforcers begin to abuse alcohol, marijuana, and cigarettes early in life, while also abusing a wider array of illicit drugs compared to those who discounted delayed reinforcers less."

Escalation or dysregulation is the next and more severe phase of substance abuse. In this phase individuals "lose control" of their addiction with large levels of drug consumption and binge drug use. Animal studies suggest that individuals with higher levels of impulsivity may be more prone to the escalation stage of substance abuse.

Impulsivity is also related to the abstinence, relapse, and treatment stages of substance abuse. People who scored high on the Barratt Impulsivity Scale (BIS) were more likely to stop treatment for cocaine abuse. Additionally, they adhered to treatment for a shorter duration than people that scored low on impulsivity. Also, impulsive people had greater cravings for drugs during withdrawal periods and were more likely to relapse. This effect was shown in a study where smokers that test high on the BIS had increased craving in response to smoking cues, and gave into the cravings more quickly than less impulsive smokers. Taken as a whole the current research suggests that impulsive individuals are less likely to abstain from drugs and more likely to relapse earlier than less impulsive individuals.

The reciprocating effect whereby substance abuse can increase impulsivity has also been researched and documented. The promoting effect of impulsivity on substance abuse and the effect of substance abuse on increased impulsivity creates a positive feedback loop that maintains substance seeking behaviors. It also makes conclusions about the direction of causality difficult. This phenomenon has been shown to be related to several substances, but not all. For example, alcohol has been shown to increase impulsivity while amphetamines have had mixed results.

Substance use disorder treatments include prescription of medications such as acamprosate, buprenorphine, disulfiram, LAAM, methadone, and naltrexone, as well as effective psychotherapeutic treatment like behavioral couples therapy, CBT, contingency management, motivational enhancement therapy, and relapse prevention.

=== Eating ===
Impulsive overeating spans from an episode of indulgence by an otherwise healthy person to chronic binges by a person with an eating disorder.

Consumption of a tempting food by non-clinical individuals increases when self-regulatory resources are previously depleted by another task, suggesting that it is caused by a breakdown in self control. Impulsive eating of unhealthy snack foods appears to be regulated by individual differences in impulsivity when self-control is weak and by attitudes towards the snack and towards healthy eating when self-control is strong. There is also evidence that greater food consumption occurs when people are in a sad mood, although it is possible that this is due more to emotional regulation than to a lack of self-control. In these cases, overeating will only take place if the food is palatable to the person, and if so individual differences in impulsivity can predict the amount of consumption.

Chronic overeating is a behavioral component of binge eating disorder, compulsive overeating, and bulimia nervosa. These diseases are more common for women and may involve eating thousands of calories at a time. Depending on which of these disorders is the underlying cause, an episode of overeating can have a variety of different motivations. Characteristics common among these three disorders include low self-esteem, depression, eating when not physically hungry, preoccupation with food, eating alone due to embarrassment, and feelings of regret or disgust after an episode. In these cases, overeating is not limited to palatable foods.

Impulsivity differentially affects disorders involving the overcontrol of food intake (such as anorexia nervosa) and disorders involving the lack of control of food intake (such as bulimia nervosa). Cognitive impulsivity, such as risk-taking, is a component of many eating disorders, including those that are restrictive. However, only people with disorders involving episodes of overeating have elevated levels of motoric impulsivity, such as reduced response inhibition capacity.

One theory suggests that binging provides a short-term escape from feelings of sadness, anger, or boredom, although it may contribute to these negative emotions in the long-term. Another theory suggests that binge eating involves reward seeking, as evidenced by decreased serotonin binding receptors of binge-eating women compared to matched-weight controls and predictive value of heightened reward sensitivity/drive in dysfunctional eating.

Treatments for clinical-grade overeating include cognitive behavioral therapy to teach people how to track and change their eating habits and actions, interpersonal psychotherapy to help people analyze the contribution of their friends and family in their disorder, and pharmacological therapies including antidepressants and SSRIs.

=== Impulse buying ===
Impulse buying consists of purchasing a product or service without any previous intent to make that purchase. It has been speculated to account for as much as eighty percent of all purchases in the United States.

There are several theories pertaining to impulsive buying. One theory suggests that it is exposure combining with the speed that a reward can be obtained that influences an individual to choose lesser immediate rewards over greater rewards that can be obtained later. For example, a person might choose to buy a candy bar because they are in the candy aisle even though they had decided earlier that they would not buy candy while in the store.

Another theory is one of self-regulation which suggests that the capacity to refrain from impulsive buying is a finite resource. As this capacity is depleted with repeated acts of restraint susceptibility to purchasing other items on impulse increases.

Finally, a third theory suggests an emotional and behavioral tie between the purchaser and the product which drives both the likelihood of an impulsive purchase as well as the degree that a person will retroactively be satisfied with that purchase result. Some studies have shown a large number of individuals are happy with purchases made on impulse (41% in one study) which is explained as a preexisting emotional attachment which has a positive relationship both with the likelihood of initiating the purchase as well as mitigating post purchase satisfaction. As an example, when purchasing team-related college paraphernalia a large percentage of those purchases are made on impulse and are tied to the degree with which a person has positive ties to that team.

Impulsive buying is seen both as an individual trait in which each person has a preconditioned or hereditary allotment, as well as a situational construct which is mitigated by such things as emotion in the moment of the purchase and the preconditioned ties an individual has with the product.

Psychotherapy and pharmacological treatments have been shown to be helpful interventions for patients with impulsive-compulsive buying disorder. Psychotherapy interventions include the use of desensitization techniques, self-help books or attending a support group. Pharmacological interventions include the use of SSRIs, such as fluvoxamine, citalopram, escitalopram, and naltrexone.

=== Impulse control disorders not elsewhere classified ===
Impulse control disorder (ICDs) are a class of DSM diagnoses that do not fall into the other diagnostic categories of the manual (e.g. substance use disorders), and that are characterized by extreme difficulty controlling impulses or urges despite negative consequences. Individuals suffering from an impulse control disorder frequently experience five stages of symptoms: compelling urge or desire, failure to resist the urge, a heightened sense of arousal, succumbing to the urge (which usually yields relief from tension), and potential remorse or feelings of guilt after the behavior is completed. Specific disorders included within this category include intermittent explosive disorder, kleptomania, pathological gambling, pyromania, trichotillomania (hair-pulling disorder), and impulse control disorders not otherwise specified (ICD NOS). ICD NOS includes other significant difficulties that seem to be related to impulsivity but do not meet the criteria for a specific DSM diagnosis.

There has been much debate over whether or not the ICDs deserve a diagnostic category of their own, or whether they are in fact phenomenologically and epidemiologically related to other major psychiatric conditions like obsessive-compulsive disorder (OCD), affective disorders, and addictive disorders. In fact, the ICD classification is likely to change with the release of the DSM-5 in May 2013. In this new revision the ICD NOS will likely be reduced or removed; proposed revisions include reclassifying trichotillomania (to be renamed hair-pulling disorder) and skin-picking disorder as obsessive-compulsive and related disorders, moving intermittent explosive disorder under the diagnostic heading of disruptive, impulse control, and conduct disorders, and gambling disorder may be included in addiction and related disorders.

The role of impulsivity in the ICDs varies. Research on kleptomania and pyromania is lacking, though there is some evidence that greater kleptomania severity is tied to poor executive functioning.

Trichotillomania and skin-picking disorder seem to be disorders that primarily involve motor impulsivity, and will likely be classified in the DSM-5 within the obsessive-compulsive and related disorders category.

Pathological gambling, in contrast, seems to involve many diverse aspects of impulsivity and abnormal reward circuitry (similar to substance use disorders) that has led to it being increasingly conceptualized as a non-substance or behavioral addiction. Evidence elucidating the role of impulsivity in pathological gambling is accumulating, with pathological gambling samples demonstrating greater response impulsivity, choice impulsivity, and reflection impulsivity than comparison control samples. Additionally, pathological gamblers tend to demonstrate greater response perseveration (compulsivity) and risky decisionmaking in laboratory gambling tasks compared to controls, though there is no strong evidence suggesting that attention and working memory are impaired in pathological gamblers. These relations between impulsivity and pathological gambling are confirmed by brain function research: pathological gamblers demonstrate less activation in the frontal cortical regions (implicated in impulsivity) compared to controls during behavioral tasks tapping response impulsivity, compulsivity, and risk/reward. Preliminary, though variable, findings also suggest that striatal activation is different between gamblers and controls, and that neurotransmitter differences (e.g. dopamine, serotonin, opioids, glutamate, norepinephrine) may exist as well.

Individuals with intermittent explosive disorder, also known as impulsive aggression, have exhibited serotonergic abnormalities and show differential activation in response to emotional stimuli and situations. Notably, intermittent explosive disorder is not associated with a higher likelihood of diagnosis with any of the other ICDs but is highly comorbid with disruptive behavior disorders in childhood. Intermittent explosive disorder is likely to be re-classified in the DSM-5 under the heading of disruptive, impulse control, and conduct disorders.

These sorts of impulse control disorders are most often treated using certain types of psychopharamcological interventions (e.g. antidepressants) and behavioral treatments like cognitive behavioral therapy.

== Theories of impulsivity ==
=== Ego (cognitive) depletion ===
According to the ego (or cognitive) depletion theory of impulsivity, self-control refers to the capacity for altering one's own responses, especially to bring them into line with standards such as ideals, values, morals, and social expectations, and to support the pursuit of long-term goals. Self-control enables a person to restrain or override one response, thereby making a different response possible. A major tenet of the theory is that engaging in acts of self-control draws from a limited "reservoir" of self-control that, when depleted, results in reduced capacity for further self-regulation. Self-control is viewed as analogous to a muscle: Just as a muscle requires strength and energy to exert force over a period of time, acts that have high self-control demands also require strength and energy to perform. Similarly, as muscles become fatigued after a period of sustained exertion and have reduced capacity to exert further force, self-control can also become depleted when demands are made of self-control resources over a period of time. Baumeister and colleagues termed the state of diminished self-control strength ego depletion (or cognitive depletion).

The strength model of self-control asserts that:

- Just as exercise can make muscles stronger, there are signs that regular exertions of self-control can improve willpower strength. These improvements typically take the form of resistance to depletion, in the sense that performance at self-control tasks deteriorates at a slower rate. Targeted efforts to control behavior in one area, such as spending money or exercise, lead to improvements in unrelated areas, such as studying or household chores. And daily exercises in self-control, such as improving posture, altering verbal behavior, and using one's nondominant hand for simple tasks, gradually produce improvements in self-control as measured by laboratory tasks. The finding that these improvements carry over into tasks vastly different from the daily exercises shows that the improvements are not due to simply increasing skill or acquiring self-efficacy from practice.
- Just as athletes begin to conserve their remaining strength when their muscles begin to tire, so do self-controllers when some of their self-regulatory resources have been expended. The severity of behavioral impairment during depletion depends in part on whether the person expects further challenges and demands. When people expect to have to exert self-control later, they will curtail current performance more severely than if no such demands are anticipated.
- Consistent with the conservation hypothesis, people can exert self-control despite ego depletion if the stakes are high enough. Offering cash incentives or other motives for good performance counteracts the effects of ego depletion. This may seem surprising but in fact it may be highly adaptive. Given the value and importance of the capacity for self-control, it would be dangerous for a person to lose that capacity completely, and so ego depletion effects may occur because people start conserving their remaining strength. When people do exert themselves on the second task, they deplete the resource even more, as reflected in severe impairments on a third task that they have not anticipated.

Empirical tests of the ego-depletion effect typically adopt dual-task paradigm. Participants assigned to an experimental ego-depletion group are required to engage in two consecutive tasks requiring self-control. Control participants are also required to engage in two consecutive tasks, but only the second task requires self-control. The strength model predicts that the performance of the experimental-group on the second self-control task will be impaired relative to that of the control group. This is because the finite self-control resources of the experimental participants will be diminished after the initial self-control task, leaving little to draw on for the second task.

The effects of ego depletion do not appear to be a product of mood or arousal. In most studies, mood and arousal has not been found to differ between participants who exerted self-control and those who did not. Likewise, mood and arousal was not related to final self-control performance. The same is true for more specific mood items, such as frustration, irritation, annoyance, boredom, or interest as well. Feedback about success and failure of the self-control efforts does not appear to affect performance. In short, the decline in self-control performance after exerting self-control appears to be directly related to the amount of self-control exerted and cannot be easily explained by other, well-established psychological processes.

=== Automatic vs. controlled processes/cognitive control ===
Dual process theory states that mental processes operate in two separate classes: automatic and controlled. In general, automatic processes are those that are experiential in nature, occur without involving higher levels of cognition, and are based on prior experiences or informal heuristics. Controlled decisions are effortful and largely conscious processes in which an individual weighs alternatives and makes a more deliberate decision.

- Automatic Process: Automatic processes have four main features. They occur unintentionally or without a conscious decision, the cost of the decision is very low in mental resources, they cannot be easily stopped, and they occur without conscious thought on the part of the individual making them.
- Controlled Process: Controlled processes also have four main features that are very close to the opposite in spectrum from their automatic counterparts. Controlled processes occur intentionally, they require the expenditure of cognitive resources, the individual making the decision can stop the process voluntarily, and the mental process is a conscious one.

Dual process theories at one time considered any single action/thought as either being automatic or controlled. However, currently they are seen as operating more along a continuum as most impulsive actions will have both controlled and automatic attributes. Automatic processes are classified according to whether they are meant to inhibit or to facilitate a thought process. For example, in one study researchers offered individuals a choice between a 1 in 10 chance of winning a prize and a 10 in 100 chance. Many participants chose one of the choices over the other without identifying that the chances inherent in each were the same as they saw either only 10 chances total as more beneficial, or of having 10 chances to win as more beneficial. In effect impulsive decisions can be made as prior information and experiences dictate one of the courses of action is more beneficial when in actuality careful consideration would better enable the individual to make a more informed and improved decision.

=== Intertemporal choice ===
Intertemporal choice is defined as "decisions with consequences that play out over time". This is often assessed using the relative value people assign to rewards at different points in time, either by asking experimental subjects to choose between alternatives or examining behavioral choices in a naturalistic setting.

Intertemporal choice is commonly measured in the laboratory using a "delayed discounting" paradigm, which measures the process of devaluing rewards and punishments that happen in the future. In this paradigm, subjects must choose between a smaller reward delivered soon and a larger reward delivered at a delay in the future. Choosing the smaller-sooner reward is considered impulsive. By repeatedly making these choices, indifference points can be estimated. For example, if someone chose $70 now over $100 in a week, but chose the $100 in a week over $60 now, it can be inferred that they are indifferent between $100 in a week and an intermediate value between $60 and $70. A delay discounting curve can be obtained for each participant by plotting their indifference points with different reward amounts and time delays. Individual differences in discounting curves are affected by personality characteristics such as self-reports of impulsivity and locus of control; personal characteristics such as age, gender, IQ, race, and culture; socioeconomic characteristics such as income and education; and many other variables. to drug addiction. Lesions of the nucleus accumbens core subregion or basolateral amygdala produce shifts towards choosing the smaller-sooner reward, suggesting the involvement of these brain regions in the preference for delayed reinforcers. There is also evidence that the orbitofrontal cortex is involved in delay discounting, although there is currently debate on whether lesions in this region result in more or less impulsivity.

Economic theory suggests that optimal discounting involves the exponential discounting of value over time. This model assumes that people and institutions should discount the value of rewards and punishments at a constant rate according to how delayed they are in time. While economically rational, recent evidence suggests that people and animals do not discount exponentially. Many studies suggest that humans and animals discount future values according to a hyperbolic discounting curve where the discount factor decreases with the length of the delay (for example, waiting from today to tomorrow involves more loss of value than waiting from twenty days to twenty-one days). Further evidence for non-constant delay discounting is suggested by the differential involvement of various brain regions in evaluating immediate versus delayed consequences. Specifically, the prefrontal cortex is activated when choosing between rewards at a short delay or a long delay, but regions associated with the dopamine system are additionally activated when the option of an immediate reinforcer is added. Additionally, intertemporal choices differ from economic models because they involve anticipation (which may involve a neurological "reward" even if the reinforcer is delayed), self-control (and the breakdown of it when faced with temptations), and representation (how the choice is framed may influence desirability of the reinforcer), none of which are accounted for by a model that assumes economic rationality.

One facet of intertemporal choice is the possibility for preference reversal, when a tempting reward becomes more highly valued than abstaining only when immediately available. For example, when sitting home alone, a person may report that they value the health benefit of not smoking a cigarette over the effect of smoking one. However, later at night when the cigarette is immediately available, their subjective value of the cigarette may rise and they may choose to smoke it.

A theory called the "primrose path" is intended to explain how preference reversal can lead to addiction in the long run. As an example, a lifetime of sobriety may be more highly valued than a lifetime of alcoholism, but, at the same time, one drink now may be more highly valued than not drinking now. Because it is always "now," the drink is always chosen, and a paradoxical effect occurs whereby the more-valued long-term alternative is not achieved because the more-valued short-term alternative is always chosen. This is an example of complex ambivalence, when a choice is made not between two concrete alternatives but between one immediate and tangible alternative (i.e. having a drink) and one delayed and abstract alternative (i.e. sobriety).

Similarities between humans and non-human animals in intertemporal choice have been studied. Pigeons and rats also discount hyperbolically; tamarin monkeys do not wait more than eight seconds to triple the amount of a food reward. The question arises as to whether this is a difference of homology or analogy—that is, whether the same underlying process underlies human-animal similarities or whether different processes are manifesting in similar patterns of results.

=== Inhibitory control ===
Inhibitory control, often conceptualized as an executive function, is the ability to inhibit or hold back a prepotent response. It is theorized that impulsive behavior reflects a deficit in this ability to inhibit a response; impulsive people may find it more difficult to inhibit action whereas non-impulsive people may find it easier to do so. There is evidence that, in normal adults, commonly used behavioral measures of inhibitory control correlate with standard self-report measures of impulsivity.

Inhibitory control may itself be multifaceted, evidenced by numerous distinct inhibition constructs that can be measured in different ways, and relate to specific types of psychopathology. Joel Nigg developed a useful working taxonomy of these different types of inhibition, drawing heavily from the fields of cognitive and personality psychology Nigg's eight proposed types of inhibition include the following:

==== Executive inhibition ====
===== Interference control =====
Suppression of a stimulus that elicits an interfering response, enabling a person to complete the primary response. Interference control can also refer to suppressing distractors.

Interference control has been measured using cognitive tasks like the stroop test, flanker tasks, dual task interference, and priming tasks. Personality researchers have used the Rothbart effortful control measures and the conscientiousness scale of the Big Five as inventory measures of interference control. Based on imaging and neural research it is theorized that the anterior cingulate, the dorsolateral prefrontal/premotor cortex, and the basal ganglia are related to interference control.

===== Cognitive inhibition =====
Cognitive inhibition is the suppression of unwanted or irrelevant thoughts to protect working memory and attention resources.

Cognitive inhibition is most often measured through tests of directed ignoring, self-report on one's intrusive thoughts, and negative priming tasks. As with interference control, personality psychologists have measured cognitive inhibition using the Rothbart Effortful Control scale and the Big Five Conscientiousness scale. The anterior cingulate, the prefrontal regions, and the association cortex seem to be involved in cognitive inhibition.

===== Behavioral inhibition =====
Behavioral Inhibition is the suppression of prepotent response.

Behavioral inhibition is usually measured using the Go/No Go task, Stop signal task, and reports of suppression of attentional orienting. Surveys that are theoretically relevant to behavioral inhibition include the Rothbart effortful control scale, and the Big Five Conscientiousness dimension. The rationale behind the use of behavioral measures like the Stop signal task is that "go" processes and "stop processes" are independent, and that, upon "go" and "stop" cues, they "race" against each other; if the go process wins the race, the prepotent response is executed, whereas if the stop processes wins the race, the response is withheld. In this context, impulsivity is conceptualized as a relatively slow stop process. The brain regions involved in behavioral inhibition appear to be the lateral and orbital prefrontal regions along with premotor processes.

===== Oculomotor inhibition =====
Oculomotor inhibition is the effortful suppression of reflexive saccade.

Oculomotor inhibition is tested using antisaccade and oculomotor tasks. Also, the Rothbart effortful control measure and the Big Five Conscientiousness dimension are thought to tap some of the effortful processes underlying the ability to suppress saccade. The frontal eye fields and the dorsolateral prefrontal cortex are involved in oculomotor inhibition.

==== Motivational inhibition ====
===== In response to punishment =====
Motivational inhibition and response in the face of punishment can be measured using tasks tapping inhibition of primary response, modified go/no go tasks, inhibition of competing response, and emotional Stroop tasks. Personality psychologists also use the Gray behavioral inhibition system measure, the Eysenck scale for neurotic introversion, and the Zuckerman Neuroticism-Anxiety scale. The Septal-hippocampal formation, cingulate, and motor systems seem to be the brain areas most involved in response to punishment.

===== In response to novelty =====
Response to novelty has been measured using the Kagan behavioral inhibition system measure and scales of neurotic introversion. The amygdaloid system is implicated in novelty response.

==== Automatic inhibition of attention ====
===== Recently inspected stimuli =====
Suppression of recently inspected stimuli for both attention and oculomotor saccade is usually measured using attentional and oculomotor inhibition of return tests. The superior colliculus and the midbrain, oculomotor pathway are involved in suppression of stimuli.

===== Neglected stimuli =====
Information at locations that are not presently being attended to is suppressed, while attending elsewhere.

This involves measures of covert attentional orienting and neglect, along with personality scales on neuroticism. The posterior association cortex and subcortical pathways are implicated in this sort of inhibition.

=== Action/Inaction goals ===
Recent psychology research also yields out the condition of impulsivity in relation to peoples' general goal setting. It is possible these action and inaction goals are underlying people's behavioral differences in their daily lives since they can demonstrate "patterns comparable to natural variation in overall activity levels". More specifically, the level of impulsivity and mania people have might positive correlated with favorable attitudes about and goals of general action while negatively respond to favorable attitudes about and goals of general inaction.

== Assessment of impulsivity ==
=== Personality tests and reports ===
==== Barratt Impulsiveness Scale ====
The Barratt Impulsiveness Scale (BIS) is one of the oldest and most widely used measures of impulsive personality traits. The first BIS was developed in 1959 by Dr. Ernest Barratt. It has been revised extensively to achieve two major goals: (1) to identify a set of "impulsiveness" items that was orthogonal to a set of "anxiety" items as measured by the Taylor Manifest Anxiety Scale (MAS) or the Cattell Anxiety Scale, and (2) to define impulsiveness within the structure of related personality traits like Eysenck's Extraversion dimension or Zuckerman's Sensation-Seeking dimension, especially the disinhibition subfactor. The BIS-11 with 30 items was developed in 1995. According to Patton and colleagues, there are 3 subscales (Attentional Impulsiveness, Motor Impulsiveness, and Non-Planning Impulsiveness) with six factors:

1. Attention: "focusing on a task at hand".
2. Motor impulsiveness: "acting on the spur of the moment".
3. Self-control: "planning and thinking carefully".
4. Cognitive complexity: "enjoying challenging mental tasks".
5. Perseverance: "a consistent life style".
6. Cognitive instability: "thought insertion and racing thoughts".

==== Eysenck Impulsiveness Scale ====
The Eysenck Impulsiveness Scale (EIS) is a 54-item yes/no questionnaire designed to measure impulsiveness. Three subscales are computed from this measure: Impulsiveness, Venturesomeness, and Empathy. Impulsiveness is defined as "behaving without thinking and without realizing the risk involved in the behavior". Venturesomeness is conceptualized as "being conscious of the risk of the behavior but acting anyway". The questionnaire was constructed through factor analysis to contain items that most highly loaded on impulsiveness and venturesomeness. The EIS is a widely used and well-validated measure.

==== Dickman Impulsivity Inventory ====
The Dickman Impulsivity Inventory was first developed in 1990 by Scott J. Dickman. This scale is based on Dickman's proposal that there are two types of impulsivity that are significantly different from one another. This includes functional impulsivity which is characterized by quick decision making when it is optimal, a trait that is often considered to be a source of pride. The scale also includes dysfunctional impulsivity which is characterized by making quick decisions when it is not optimal. This type of impulsivity is most often associated with life difficulties including substance abuse problems and other negative outcomes.

This scale includes 63 items of which 23 are related to dysfunctional impulsivity, 17 are related to functional impulsivity, and 23 are filler questions that relate to neither construct. This scale has been developed into a version for use with children as well as into several languages. Dickman showed there is no correlation between these two tendencies across individuals, and they also have different cognitive correlates.

==== UPPS Impulsive Behavior Scale ====
The UPPS Impulsive Behavior Scale is a 45-item self-report questionnaire that was designed to measure impulsivity across dimensions of the Five Factor Model of personality. The UPPS includes 4 sub-scales: lack of premeditation, urgency, lack of perseverance, and sensation-seeking.

UPPS-P Impulsive Behavior Scale (UPPS-P) is a revised version of the UPPS, including 59 items. It assesses an additional personality pathway to impulsive behavior, Positive Urgency, in addition to the four pathways assessed in the original version of the scale: Urgency (now Negative Urgency), (lack of) Premeditation, (lack of) Perseverance, and Sensation Seeking

UPPS-P short version (UPPS-Ps) is 20-item scale that evaluates five different impulsivity facets (4 items per dimension).

UPPS-R Interview is a semi-structured interview that measures the degree to which individuals exhibit the various components of impulsivity assessed by the UPPS-P.

==== Lifetime History of Impulsive Behaviors ====
Lifetime History of Impulsive Behaviors (LHIB) is a 53-item questionnaire designed to assess lifetime history of impulsive behavior (as opposed to impulsive tendencies) as well as the level of distress and impairment associated with these behaviors. The assessment battery was designed to measure the following six dimensions: (a) impulsivity, (b) sensation seeking, (c) trait anxiety, (d) state depression, (e) empathy, and (f) social desirability. The LHIB consists of scales for clinically significant impulsivity, non-clinically significant impulsivity, and impulsivity related distress/impairment.

==== Behavioral Inhibition System/Behavioral Activation System ====
Behavioral Inhibition System/Behavioral Activation System (BIS/BAS) was developed based on the Gray's biopsychological theory of personality which suggests that there are two general motivational systems that underlie behavior and affect: BIS and BAS. This 20-item self-report questionnaire is designed to assess dispositional BIS and BAS sensitivities.

==== Impulsive/Premeditated Aggression Scale ====
Impulsive/Premeditated Aggression Scale (IPAS) is a 30-item self-report questionnaire. Half of the items describe impulsive aggression and half the items describe premeditated aggression. Aggressive behavior has traditionally been classified into two distinct subtypes, impulsive or premeditated. Impulsive aggression is defined as a hair-trigger aggressive response to provocation with loss of behavioral control. Premeditated aggression is defined as a planned or conscious aggressive act, not spontaneous or related to an agitated state. The IPAS is designed to characterize aggressive behavior as predominately impulsive or predominately premeditated in nature. Those subjects who clustered on the impulsive factor showed a broad range of emotional and cognitive impairments; those who clustered on the premeditated factor showed a greater inclination for aggression and anti-social behaviour.

==== Padua Inventory ====
The Padua Inventory (PI) consists of 60 items describing common obsessional and compulsive behavior and allows investigation of such problems in normal and clinical subjects.

=== Behavioral paradigms ===
A wide variety of behavioral tests have been devised for the assessment of impulsivity in both clinical and experimental settings. While no single test is a perfect predictor or a sufficient replacement for an actual clinical diagnosis, when used in conjunction with parent/teacher reports, behavioral surveys, and other diagnostic criteria, the utility of behavioral paradigms lies in their ability to narrow in on specific, discrete aspects of the impulsivity umbrella. Quantifying specific deficits is of use to the clinician and the experimenter, both of whom are generally concerned with obtaining objectively measurable treatment effects.

==== Marshmallow test ====
One widely recognizable test for impulsivity is the delay of gratification paradigm commonly known as the 'marshmallow test'. Developed in the 1960s to assess 'willpower' and self-control in preschoolers, the marshmallow test consists of placing a single marshmallow in front of a child and informing them that they will be left alone in the room for some duration. The child is told that if the marshmallow remains uneaten when the experimenter returns, they will be awarded a second marshmallow, both of which can then be eaten.

Despite its simplicity and ease of administration, evidence from longitudinal studies suggests that the number of seconds preschoolers wait to obtain the second marshmallow is predictive of higher SAT scores, better social and emotional coping in adolescence, higher educational achievement, and less cocaine/crack use.

==== Delay discounting ====
Like the marshmallow test, delay discounting is also a delay of gratification paradigm. It is designed around the principle that the subjective value of a reinforcer decreases, or is 'discounted,' as the delay to reinforcement increases. Subjects are given varying choices between smaller, immediate rewards and larger, delayed rewards. By manipulating reward magnitude and/or reward delay over multiple trials, 'indifference' points can be estimated whereby choosing the small, immediate reward, or the large, delayed reward are about equally likely. Subjects are labeled impulsive when their indifference points decline more steeply as a function of delay compared to the normal population (i.e. greater preference for immediate reward). Unlike the marshmallow test, delay discounting does not require verbal instruction and can be implemented on non-human animals.

==== Go/no-go and stop-signal reaction time tasks ====
Two common tests of response inhibition used in humans are the go/no-go task, and a slight variant known as the stop-signal reaction time (SSRT) test. During a go/no-task, the participant is trained over multiple trials to make a particular response (e.g., a key-press) when presented with a 'go' signal. On some trials, a 'stop' signal is presented just prior to, or simultaneously with the 'go' signal, and the subject must inhibit the impending response.

The SSRT test is similar, except that the 'stop' signal is presented after the 'go' signal. This small modification increases the difficulty of inhibiting the 'go' response, because the participant has typically already initiated the 'go' response by the time the 'stop' signal is presented. The participant is instructed to respond as fast as possible to the 'go' signal while maintaining the highest possible inhibition accuracy (on no-go trials). During the task, the time at which the 'stop' signal is presented (the stop signal delay or SSD) is dynamically adjusted to match the time after the 'go' signal at which the participant is just able/unable to inhibit their 'go' response. If the participant fails to inhibit their 'go' response, the 'stop' signal is moved slightly closer to the original 'go' signal, and if the participant successfully inhibits their 'go' response, the 'stop' signal is moved slightly ahead in time. The SSRT is thus measured as the average 'go' response time minus the average 'stop' signal presentation time (SSD).

==== Balloon Analogue Risk Task ====
The balloon analogue risk task (BART) was designed to assess risk-taking behavior. Subjects are presented with a computer depiction of a balloon that can be incrementally inflated by pressing a response key. As the balloon inflates, the subject accumulates rewards with each new key-press. The balloon is programmed with a constant probability of popping. If the balloon pops, all rewards for that balloon are lost, or the subject may choose to stop inflating and 'bank' the reward for that balloon at any time. Therefore, more key-presses equate to greater reward, but also greater probability of popping and cancelling rewards for that trial. The BART assumes that those with an affinity for 'risk-taking' are more likely to pop the balloon, earning less reward overall than the typical population.

==== Iowa Gambling Task ====
The Iowa gambling task (IGT) is a test originally meant to measure decision making specifically within individuals who have ventromedial prefrontal cortex damage. The concept of impulsivity as relates to the IGT is one in which impulsive decisions are a function of an individual's lack of ability to make rational decisions over time due to an over amplification of emotional/somatic reward. In the IGT individuals are provided four decks of cards to choose from. Two of these decks provide much higher rewards but the deductions are also much higher while the second two decks have lower rewards per card but also much lower deductions. Over time anyone who chooses predominantly from the high rewards decks will lose money while those who choose from the smaller rewards decks will gain money.

The IGT uses hot and cold processes in its concept of decision making. Hot decision making involves emotional responses to the material presented based on motivation related to reward and punishment. Cold processes occur when an individual uses rational cognitive determinations when making decisions. Combined an individual should gain a positive emotional reaction when choices have beneficial consequences and will have negative emotional responses tied to choices that have greater negative consequences. In general, healthy responders to the IGT will begin to drift to the lower gain decks as they realize that they are gaining more money than they lose both through an ability to recognize that one is more consistently providing rewards as well as through the emotions related to winning consistently. However, those who have emotional deficits will fail to recognize that they are losing money over time and will continue to be more influenced by the exhilaration of higher value rewards without being influenced by the negative emotions of the loses associated with them.

For more information concerning these process refer to the Somatic marker hypothesis

==== Differential Reinforcement of Low Response Rate Task ====
Differential reinforcement of low response rate (DRL) described by Ferster and Skinner is used to encourage low rates of responding. It is derived from research in operant conditioning that provides an excellent opportunity to measure the hyperactive child's ability to inhibit behavioral responding. Hyperactive children were relatively unable to perform efficiently on the task, and this deficit endured regardless of age, IQ, or experimental condition. Therefore, it can be used to discriminate accurately between teacher rated and parent rated hyperactive and nonhyperactive children. In this procedure, responses that occur before a set time interval has passed are not reinforced and reset the time required between behaviors.

In a study, a child was taken to the experimental room and told that they were going to play a game in which they had a chance to win a lot of M&M's. Every time they made the light of the reward indicator by pressing a red button, they would earn an M&M's. However, they had to wait a while (6 seconds) before they could press it to get another point. If they had pressed the button too soon, then they would have not gotten a point, and the light would not go on, and they had to wait a while before they could press it to get another point.

Researchers have also observed that subjects in a time-based situation will often engage in a sequence or chain of behaviors between reinforceable responses. This is because this collateral behavior sequence helps the subject "wait out" the required temporal delay between responses.

==== Other ====
Other common impulsivity tasks include the Continuous performance task (CPT), 5-choice serial reaction time task (5-CSRTT), Stroop task, and Matching Familiar Figures Task. A more recent behavioral risk-taking measure is the Helsinki Aiming Task (HAT), a computerized task in which participants aim at a target under varying levels of simulated gun inaccuracy and penalty for missing, allowing risk-taking and immediate responses to positive and negative outcomes to be measured.

== Pharmacology and neurobiology ==
=== Neurobiological findings ===
Although the precise neural mechanisms underlying disorders of impulse control are not fully known, the prefrontal cortex (PFC) is the brain region most ubiquitously implicated in impulsivity. Damage to the prefrontal cortex has been associated with difficulties preparing to act, switching between response alternatives, and inhibiting inappropriate responses. Recent research has uncovered additional regions of interest, as well as highlighted particular subregions of the PFC, that can be tied to performance in specific behavioral tasks.

==== Delay discounting ====
Excitotoxic lesions in the nucleus accumbens core have been shown to increase preference for the smaller, immediate reward, whereas lesions to the nucleus accumbens shell have had no observable effect. Additionally, lesions of the basolateral amygdala, a region tied closely to the PFC, negatively affect impulsive choice similarly to what is observed in the nucleus accumbens core lesions. Moreover, dorsal striatum may also be involved in impulsive choice in an intricate manner.

==== Go/No-go and Stop-signal reaction time test ====
The orbitofrontal cortex is now thought to play a role in disinhibiting, and injury to other brain structures, such as to the right inferior frontal gyrus, a specific subregion of the PFC, has been associated with deficits in stop-signal inhibition.

==== 5-Choice Serial Reaction Time Task (5-CSRTT) and Differential Reinforcement of Low rates (DRL) ====
As with delay discounting, lesion studies have implicated the core region of the nucleus accumbens in response inhibition for both DRL and 5-CSRTT. Premature responses in the 5-CSRTT may also be modulated by other systems within the ventral striatum. In the 5-CSRTT, lesions of the anterior cingulate cortex have been shown to increase impulsive responding, and lesions to the prelimbic cortex impair attentional performance.

==== Iowa Gambling Task ====
Patients with damage to the ventromedial frontal cortex exhibit poor decision-making and persist in making risky choices in the Iowa Gambling Task.

=== Neurochemical and pharmacological findings ===
The primary pharmacological treatments for ADHD are methylphenidate (Ritalin) and amphetamine. Both methylphenidate and amphetamines block re-uptake of dopamine and norepinephrine into the pre-synaptic neuron, acting to increase post-synaptic levels of dopamine and norepinephrine. Of these two monoamines, increased availability of dopamine is considered the primary cause for the ameliorative effects of ADHD medications, whereas increased levels of norepinephrine may be efficacious only to the extent that it has downstream, indirect effects on dopamine. The effectiveness of dopamine re-uptake inhibitors in treating the symptoms of ADHD has led to the hypothesis that ADHD may arise from low tonic levels of dopamine (particularly in the fronto-limbic circuitry), but evidence in support of this theory is mixed.

== Genetics ==
There are several difficulties when it comes to trying to identify a gene for complex traits such as impulsivity, such as genetic heterogeneity. Another difficulty is that the genes in question might sometimes show incomplete penetrance, "where a given gene variant does not always cause the phenotype". Much of the research on the genetics of impulsivity-related disorders, such as ADHD, is based on family or linkage studies. There are several genes of interest that have been studied in an attempt to find the major genetic contributors to impulsivity. Some of these genes are:

- DAT1 is the dopamine transporter gene which is responsible for the active reuptake of dopamine from the neural synapse. DAT1 polymorphisms have been shown to be linked to hyperactivity and ADHD.
- DRD4 is the dopamine D4 receptor gene and is associated with ADHD and novelty seeking behaviors. It has been proposed that novelty seeking is associated with impulsivity. Mice deficient for DRD4 have shown less behavioral responses to novelty.
- 5HT2A is the serotonin receptor gene. The serotonin 2A receptor gene has been associated with both hyper locomotion, ADHD, as well as impulsivity. Subjects with a particular polymorphism of the 5HT2A gene made more commission errors during a punishment-reward condition in a go/no-go task.
- HTR2B a serotonin receptor gene.
- CTNNA2 encodes for a brain-expressed α-catenin that has been associated with Excitement-Seeking in a genome-wide association study (GWAS) of 7860 individuals.

== Intervention ==
=== Interventions to impact impulsivity generally ===
While impulsivity can take on pathological forms (e.g. substance use disorder, ADHD), there are less severe, non-clinical forms of problematic impulsivity in many people's daily lives. Research on the different facets of impulsivity can inform small interventions to change decision making and reduce impulsive behavior For example, changing cognitive representations of rewards (e.g. making long term rewards seem more concrete) and/or creating situations of "precommitment" (eliminating the option of changing one's mind later) can reduce the preference for immediate reward seen in delay discounting.

==== Brain training ====
Brain training interventions include laboratory-based interventions (e.g. training using tasks like go/no go) as well as community, family, and school based interventions that are ecologically valid (e.g. teaching techniques for regulating emotions or behaviors) and can be used with individuals with non-clinical levels of impulsivity. Both sorts of interventions are aimed at improving executive functioning and self-control capacities, with different interventions specifically targeting different aspects of executive functioning like inhibitory control, working memory, or attention. Emerging evidence suggests that brain training interventions may succeed in impacting executive function, including inhibitory control. Inhibitory control training specifically is accumulating evidence that it can help individuals resist temptation to consume high calorie food and drinking behavior. Some have voiced concerns that the favorable results of studies testing working memory training should be interpreted with caution, claiming that conclusions regarding changes to abilities are measured using single tasks, inconsistent use of working memory tasks, no-contact control groups, and subjective measurements of change.

=== Treatment of specific disorders of impulsivity ===
Behavioral, psychosocial, and psychopharmacological treatments for disorders involving impulsivity are common.

==== Psychopharmacological intervention ====
Psychopharmacological intervention in disorders of impulsivity has shown evidence of positive effects; common pharmacological interventions include the use of stimulant medication, selective serotonin reuptake inhibitors (SSRIs) and other antidepressants. ADHD has a well-established evidence base supporting the use of stimulant medication for the reduction of ADHD symptoms. Pathological gambling has also been studied in drug trials, and there is evidence that gambling is responsive to SSRIs and other antidepressants. Evidence based pharmacological treatment for trichotillomania is not yet available, with mixed results of studies investigating the use of SSRIs, though cognitive behavioral therapy has shown positive effects. Intermittent explosive disorder is most often treated with mood stabilizers, SSRIs, beta blockers, alpha agonists, and anti-psychotics (all of which have shown positive effects). There is evidence that some pharmacological interventions are efficacious in treating substance-use disorders, though their use can depend on the type of substance that is abused. Pharmacological treatments for substance-use disorders include acamprosate, buprenorphine, disulfiram, LAAM, methadone, and naltrexone.

==== Behavioral interventions ====
Behavioral interventions also have a fairly strong evidence base in impulse-control disorders. In ADHD, the behavioral interventions of behavioral parent training, behavioral classroom management, and intensive peer-focused behavioral interventions in recreational settings meet stringent guidelines qualifying them for evidence based treatment status. In addition, a recent meta-analysis of evidence-based ADHD treatment found organization training to be a well-established treatment method. Empirically validated behavioral treatments for substance use disorder are fairly similar across substance use disorders, and include behavioral couples therapy, CBT, contingency management, motivational enhancement therapy, and relapse prevention. Pyromania and kleptomania are understudied (due in large part to the illegality of the behaviors), though there is some evidence that psychotherapeutic interventions (CBT, short term counseling, day treatment programs) are efficacious in treating pyromania, while kleptomania seems to be best addressed using SSRIs. Additionally, therapies including CBT, family therapy, and social skill training have shown positive effects on explosive aggressive behaviors.

== See also ==
- Affect
- ADHD
- Addiction
- Autism
- Creativity
- Deferred gratification
- Drive theory
- Emotion
- Feeling
- Gaffe
- Instinct
- Impulse control disorder
- Sensation seeking
- Novelty seeking
- Alternative five model of personality
