= Henik =

Henik may refer to:

- Henik Lake, lake in Kivalliq Region, Canada
- Avishai Henik (born 1945), Israeli neurocognitive psychologist
- Henik (footballer) (born 1989), Henik Luiz de Andrade, Brazilian footballer
