= Cognitive test =

Assessments of the cognitive capabilities of humans and other animals

Cognitive tests are assessments of the cognitive capabilities of humans and other animals. Tests administered to humans include various forms of IQ tests; those administered to animals include the mirror test (a test of visual self-awareness) and the T maze test (which tests learning ability). Such testing is used in psychology and psychometrics, as well as other fields studying human and animal intelligence.

Modern cognitive tests originated through the work of James McKeen Cattell who coined the term "mental tests". They followed Francis Galton's development of physical and physiological tests. For example, Galton measured strength of grip and height and weight. He established an "Anthropometric Laboratory" in the 1880s where patrons paid to have physical and physiological attributes measured. Galton's measurements had an enormous influence on psychology. Cattell continued the measurement approach with simple measurements of perception. Cattell's tests were eventually abandoned in favor of the battery test approach developed by Alfred Binet.

== List of human tests ==
Human tests of cognitive ability measure a wide spectrum of mental abilities. When considering tests of cognitive ability, it is paramount to consider evidence for their reliability, validity, length, and mode of administration (e.g., some assessments require a trained administrator to be present with the respondent). It is also essential to understand which cognitive abilities are measured by each test and sub-test. There are also free, searchable websites with compendia of tests and the constructs they measure. Below are a small sample of some of the best-known measures of cognitive abilities and brief descriptions of their content:

- Inductive reasoning tests
  - Inductive reasoning aptitude: Also known as abstract reasoning tests and diagrammatic style tests, are utilized by examining a person's problem-solving skills. This test is used to "measure the ability to work flexibly with unfamiliar information to find solutions." These tests are often visualized through a set of patterns or sequences, with the user determining what does or does not belong.
- Intelligence quotient
  - Situational judgement test: A situational judgement test is used to examine how an individual responds to certain situations. Oftentimes these tests include a scenario with multiple responses, with the user selecting which response they feel is the most appropriate given the situation. This is used to assess how the user would respond to certain situations that may arise in the future.
    - Working memory
  - Intelligence tests
    - Kohs block design test: "The Kohs Block Design Test is a non-verbal assessment of executive functioning, useful with the language and hearing impaired"
    - Mental age
    - Miller Analogies Test: According to Pearson Assessments, the Miller Analogies Test is used to determine a students ability to think analytically. The test is 60 minutes long, and is used by schools to determine those who are able to think analytically, and those who are only "memorizing and repeating information"
    - Otis–Lennon School Ability Test: The OLSAT is a multiple choice exam administered to students anywhere from Pre-K to 12th grade, used to identify which students are intellectually gifted. Students will need to be able to: "Follow directions, detect likenesses and differences, recall words and numbers, classify items, establish sequences, solve arithmetic problems, and complete analogies." The test consists of a mixture between verbal and non-verbal sections, helping inform the schools of the students "verbal, nonverbal, and quantitative ability"
    - Raven's Progressive Matrices: The Raven's Progressive Matrices is a nonverbal test consisting of 60 multiple choice questions. This test is used to measure the individual's abstract reasoning, and is considered a nonverbal way to test an individual's "fluid intelligence."
    - Stanford–Binet Intelligence Scales: By measuring the memory, reasoning, knowledge, and processing power of the user, this test is able to determine "an individual's overall intelligence, cognitive ability, and detect any cognitive impairment or learning disabilities." This test measures five factors of cognitive ability, which are as follows: "fluid reasoning, knowledge, quantitative reasoning, visual-spatial processing and working memory."
    - Wechsler Adult Intelligence Scale: The Wechsler Adult Intelligence Scale (WAIS) is used to determine and assess the intelligence of the participant. This is one of the more common tests used to test an individual's intelligence quotient. Throughout its history, this test has been revised multiple times since its creation, starting with the WAIS in 1955, to the WAIS-R in 1981, to the WAIS-III in 1996, and most recently the WAIS-IV in 2008. This test helps assess the level of the individuals verbal comprehension, perceptual reasoning, working memory, and processing speed.
    - Wechsler Intelligence Scale for Children: The Wechsler Intelligence Scale for Children (WISC) is for children within the age range of six to sixteen years old. While this test can be used to help determine a child's intelligence quotient, it is often used to determine a child's cognitive abilities. First introduced in 1949, the WSIC is now on its fifth edition (WISC-V), and was most recently updated in 2014. Similar to the WAIS (Wechsler Adult Intelligence Scale), this test helps assess the level of the individuals verbal comprehension, perceptual reasoning, working memory, and processing speed.
    - Wechsler Preschool and Primary Scale of Intelligence: The Wechsler Preschool and Primary Scale of Intelligence (WPPSI) is used to assess the cognitive ability of children ages two years and six months old to seven years and seven months old. The current version of the test is the fourth edition (WPPSI-IV). Children between the ages of two years and six months old, to three years and 11 months old, are testing on the following: "block design, information, object assembly, picture naming, and receptive vocabulary". Children between the ages of four years old, to seven years and 7 months old, are testing on the following: "coding, comprehension, matrix reasoning, picture completion, picture concepts, similarities, symbol search, vocabulary, and word reasoning."
    - Wonderlic test: The Wonderlic test is a multiple choice test consisting of 50 questions within a 12-minute time frame. Throughout the test, the questions become more and more difficult. The test is used to determine not only the individuals intelligence quotient, but also the strengths and weaknesses of the individual. The test consists of questions ranging from "English, reading, math, and logic problems" The Wonderlic test is notoriously used by NFL teams to help gain a better understanding of college prospects during the NFL combine.
- Cognitive development tests
  - Cambridge Neuropsychological Test Automated Battery: The Cambridge Neuropsychological Test Automated Battery (CANTAB) is a test used to assess the "neuro-cognitive dysfunctions associated with neurologic disorders, phannacologic manipulations, and neuro-cognitive syndromes." CANTAB is computer based program from Cambridge Cognition, and can test for "working memory, learning and executive function; visual, verbal and episodic memory; attention, information processing and reaction time; social and emotion recognition, decision making and response control."
  - CAT4: The Cognitive Ability Test was developed by GL Education and is used to predict student success through the evaluation of verbal, non-verbal, mathematical, and spatial reasoning. It is being used by many international schools as part of their admissions process.
  - CDR computerized assessment system: The Cognitive Drug Research computerized assessment system is used to help determine if a drug has "cognitive-impairing properties". It is also used to "ensure that unwanted interactions with alcohol and other medications do not occur, or, if they do, to put them in context."
  - Cognitive bias (see also Emotion in animals § Cognitive bias test)
  - Cognitive pretesting: Cognitive pretests are used to evaluate the "comprehensibility of questions", usually given on a survey. This gives the surveyors a better understanding of how their questions are being perceived, and the "quality of the data" that is gained from the survey.
  - Draw-a-Person test: The Draw-a-Person test can be used on children, adolescents, and adults. It is most commonly used as a test for children and adolescents to assess their cognitive and intellectual ability by scoring their ability to draw human figures.
  - Knox Cubes: The Knox Cube Imitation Test (KCIT) is a nonverbal test used to assess intelligence. The creator of the KCIT, Howard A. Knox, described the test as: "Four 1-inch [black] cubes, 4 inches apart, are fastened to a piece of thin boarding. The movements and tapping are done with a smaller cube. The operator moves the cube from left to right facing the subject, and after completing each movement, the latter is asked to do likewise. Line a is tried first, then b, and so on to e. Three trials are given if necessary on lines a, b, c, and d, and five trials if needed on line e. To obtain the correct perspective the subject should be two feet from the cubes. The movements of the operator should be slow and deliberate."
  - Modern Language Aptitude Test
  - Multiple choice: The style of multiple choice examination was expanded upon in 1934 when IBM introduced a "test scoring machine" that electronically sensed the location of lead pencil marks on a scanning sheet. This further increased the efficiency of scoring multiple-choice items and created a large-scale educational testing method.
  - Pimsleur Language Aptitude Battery:
    - Grade levels: 6, 7, 8, 9, 10, 11, 12
    - Proficiency level: Beginner
    - Intended test use: placement, admission, fulfilling a requirement, aptitude
    - Skills tested: listening, grammar, vocabulary
    - Test length: 50–60 minutes
    - Test materials: reusable test booklet, consumable answer sheet, consumable performance chart and report to parents, test administrator manual, audio CD, scoring stencil for test administrator
    - Test format: multiple choice
    - Scoring method: number correct
    - Results reported: percentile, raw score
    - Administered by: trained testers, classroom teachers, school administrators
    - Administration time period: prior to foreign language study, at discretion of guidance counselor, school psychologist, or other administration
  - Porteus Maze test:
    - a supplement to the Stanford-Binet Intelligence Test.
    - PMT performance seems to be a valid indicator of planning and behavioral disinhibition across socioeconomic status and culture, can be administered without the use of language, and is inexpensive. The PMT also have a relatively short administration time of 10–15 minutes.
- Consensus based assessment
  - Knowledge organization: Features Ranganathan's PMEST formula: Personality, Matter, Energy, Space and Time, consisting of five fundamental categories- the arrangement of which is used to establish the facet order.
  - Knowledge hierarchies
- Memory
  - Iconic memory
  - Long-term memory
  - Short-term memory
  - Semantic memory
  - Episodic memory
  - Visual short-term memory
  - Working memory
- Self
  - Intelligent self-assessment
  - Rouge test
  - Mirror test
  - Metacognition
  - The Sally–Anne test (The ability to attribute false beliefs to others): This test has been used in psychological research to investigate theory of mind. It has been suggested that lacking a Theory of Mind may be the reasoning behind some of the communication difficulties accompanied by individuals with autism.
- Thought
- Mental chronometry
- Neuropsychological tests: These are standardized test which are given in the same manner to all examinees and are scored in a similar fashion. The examinees scores on the tests are interpreted by comparing their score to that of healthy individuals of a similar demographic background and to standard levels of operation.

== List of animal tests ==
- Memory
  - Working memory
    - Delayed-non-matching to place
    - Trial-unique delayed non-matching to location
  - Short-term memory
    - Y-maze
  - Long-term memory
    - Morris water maze
    - Contextual fear conditioning
- Attention
  - 5-choice serial reaction time task
- Executive control
  - Reversal learning
- Motivation
  - Fixed-ratio/Progressive ratio task

== See also ==
- Cognition
- Intelligence quotient
- Montreal Cognitive Assessment
