= Roi Cohen Kadosh =

Israeli-British cognitive neuroscientist

- רועי כהן קדוש
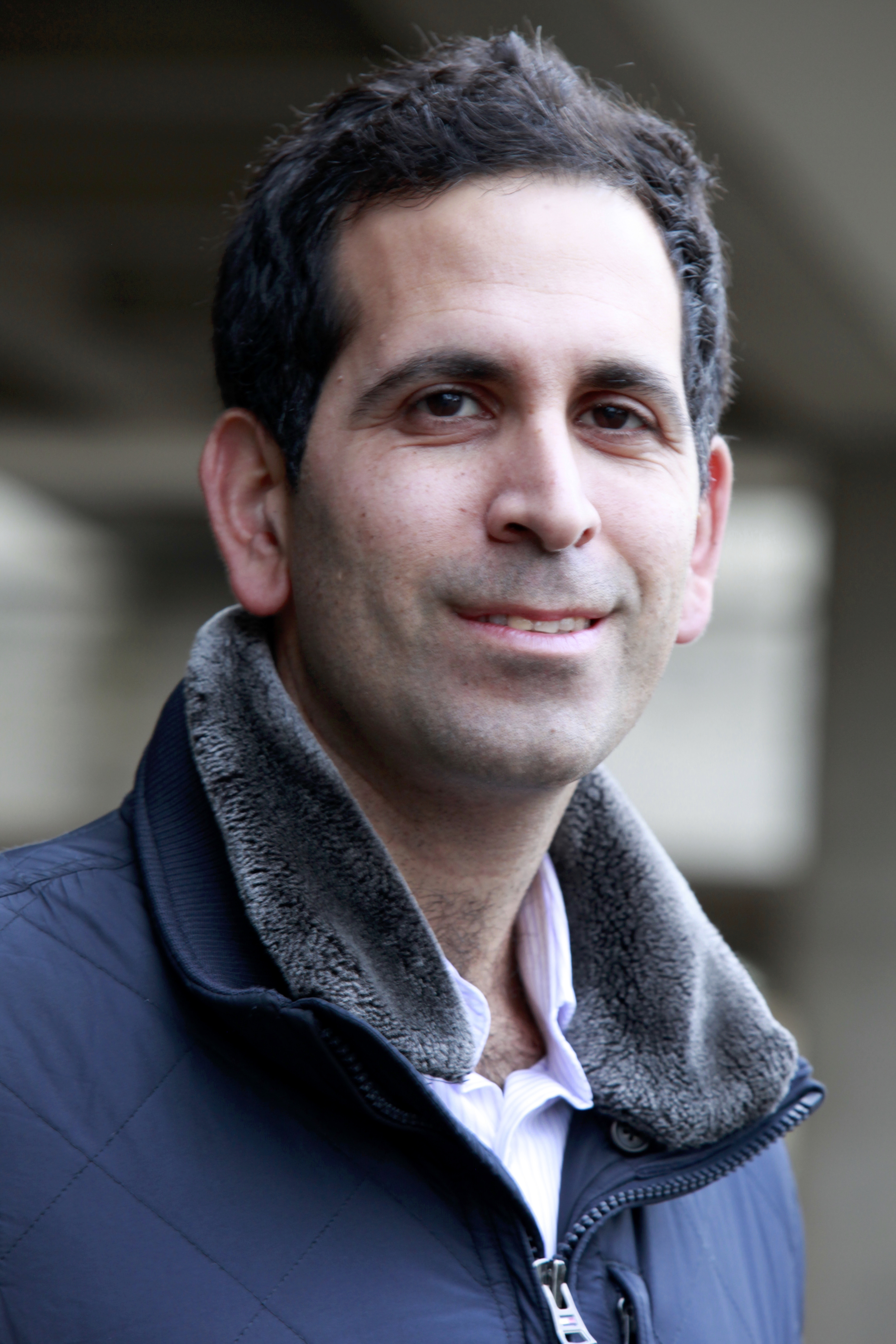
- Roi in 2016

Personal details
- Born: 1976 (age 49–50) Israel
- Awards: Paul Bertelson Award (2013); Spearman Medal (2014); Blackham Lecture Medal (2023)
- Website: Prof Roi Cohen Kadosh - University of Surrey
- Scientific career
- Fields: Cognitive Neuroscience, Numerical Cognition, Cognitive enhancement
- Institutions: University of Surrey; University of Oxford
- Thesis: The Size Congruity Effect and Magnitude Processing: Mental Operations and Neuropsychological Mechanisms (2006)
- Doctoral advisor: Avishai Henik

Roi Cohen Kadosh (Hebrew: רועי כהן קדוש; born 1976) is an Israeli–British cognitive neuroscientist whose research spans numerical and mathematical cognition, learning, attention, and cognitive enhancement. He is Professor of Cognitive Neuroscience and Head of the School of Psychology at the University of Surrey, where he has led strategic expansion in education and research. He is the founder of Cognite Neurotechnology Ltd, a company translating AI-personalised brain stimulation into real-world applications, and co-supported the creation of Tech Innosphere Ltd and has served as their scientific advisor on the clinical translation of non-invasive brain stimulation for ADHD since its establishment. He has served as Non-Executive Director of the Surrey and Borders Partnership NHS Foundation Trust. At the international level, he chaired the European Research Council's Advanced Grants panel on the Human Mind and its Complexity and the Portuguese Fundação para a Ciência e a Tecnologia Psychology R&D Unit Evaluation Panel. He has advised national governments, the OECD, UNESCO, and the UK MHRA on neuroscience policy, innovation, and ethics.

== Early life and education ==
Cohen Kadosh was born in Israel in 1976. He became interested in psychology at age 14, following his mother's illness and early death. He received a BA in Behavioral Sciences in 2002 and a direct-track PhD in neuropsychology (summa cum laude) in 2007 from Ben-Gurion University of the Negev under the supervision of Avishai Henik. His doctoral thesis was titled The Size Congruity Effect and Magnitude Processing: Mental Operations and Neuropsychological Mechanisms.

== Career ==
In 2009 he received a Wellcome Trust Career Development Fellowship to move to the University of Oxford where he established his lab. In 2015 he received the Professorial Distinction Award by the University of Oxford and became a full professor of Cognitive Neuroscience. He was also a Senior Research Fellow at Jesus College, Oxford. In 2021, he joined the University of Surrey as Professor of Cognitive Neuroscience and Head of the School of Psychology. In 2021 he also founded Cognite Neurotechnology Ltd, a start-up company that uses the findings from his studies to combine AI and neuromodulation to provide personalised, safe, and painless technology to improve cognition and learning for therapeutic or augmentation purposes.

=== Research ===
Cohen Kadosh's work integrates psychology, neuroscience, education, and neurotechnology to study and optimise learning and attention. His group has shown that the balance of neuronal excitation and inhibition (E/I) relates to learning outcomes and predicts responsiveness to neurostimulation, and has examined how functional connectivity and GABAergic signalling modulate stimulation-related gains in mathematical learning. Cohen Kadosh has also pioneered the use of neurostimulation to modulate E/I activity. In a healthy brain, excitation and inhibition are balanced to ensure proper functioning of neural circuits. Disruptions in this balance are linked to a variety of cognitive and neurological conditions, including ADHD, schizophrenia, and autism.

He has co-authored clinical and translational studies of combined cognitive training and non-invasive brain stimulation (including tRNS), reporting benefits for attention and learning, and more recently demonstrated an AI-personalised, home-based stimulation system that enhanced sustained attention.

Earlier contributions include work on numerical cognition and the use of non-invasive stimulation to causally modulate numerical competence, as well as studies on synaesthesia indicating enhanced cortical excitability in primary visual cortex and its modulation.

Cohen Kadosh has also contributed to neuroethics and policy discussions on the regulation and responsible use of cognitive enhancement devices.

=== Awards and honours ===
He has received more than 60 awards, grants, and honours. Selected distinctions include:

- The Sieratzki-Korczyn Prize for Advances in the Neurosciences. (2009)
- The Career Development Award from the Society for Neuroscience. (2010)
- The Paul Bertelson Award from the European Society for Cognitive Psychology. (2013)
- The British Psychological Society announced that he would be the recipient of the Spearman Medal. (2014)
- An Honorable Mention for Biomedicine & Neuroscience at the 2015 PROSE Awards from the Association of American Publishers for his book, The Stimulated Brain. (2015)
- The International Mind, Brain and Education Society (IMBES) Early Career Award. (2016)
- The Blackham Lecture Medal from Humanists UK. (2023)
- Membership of the Academia Europaea. (2026)

In addition, he has contributed to the wider national and international academic community's general life through various roles and activities including advising policymakers, non-governmental agencies, and commercial companies, co-founding international scientific societies, and chairing international panels, including the ERC and FCT.

=== Publications ===
==== Books ====
- Non-invasive brain stimulation (NIBS) in neurodevelopmental disorders (ed. 2021)
- The Oxford Handbook of Numerical Cognition (co-ed. 2015)
- The Stimulated Brain: Cognitive Enhancement Using Non-Invasive Brain Stimulation (ed. 2014)

==== Selected Papers ====
- Personalized home-based neurostimulation via AI optimization augments sustained attention - npj Digital Medicine (2025)
- Functional connectivity and GABAergic signaling modulate the enhancement effect of neurostimulation on mathematical learning - PLOS Biology (2025)
- Human Neuronal Excitation/Inhibition Balance Explains and Predicts Neurostimulation Induced Learning Benefits - PLOS Biology (2023)
- Transcranial Random Noise Stimulation combined with Cognitive Training for Treating ADHD: A Randomized, Sham-Controlled Clinical Trial - Translation Psychiatry (2023)
- The impact of a lack of mathematical education on brain development and future attainment - PNAS (2021)
- Long-term enhancement of brain function and cognition using cognitive training and brain stimulation - Current Biology (2013)
- The Neuroethics of Non-invasive Brain Stimulation; Current Biology - Current Biology (2012)

==== Miscellaneous ====
- The Neuroscience of Mathematical Cognition and Learning (2014). An Expert Paper produced on the request of the Organisation for Economic Co-operation and Development (OECD), Paris.
- The regulation of cognitive enhancement devices (Policy Paper, 2014).

=== Public engagement ===
As part of his work to improve public understanding of science, Cohen Kadosh has appeared in national and international media including BBC Six O'Clock News, BBC News, the Will AI...? and Nature podcasts, Stephen Hawking's Science Of The Future programme, and TEDx.

He delivered Humanists UK's Blackham Lecture in 2023 on "Neuroscience, ethics, and ADHD"; Humanists UK reported it as a record-breaking edition of the annual lecture.

His research has been reported in the press and specialist outlets. Coverage includes UK national media on a paediatric ADHD brain stimulation work, as well as international write-ups on AI-personalised, home-based neurostimulation to enhance sustained attention, and mathematical learning.

Cohen Kadosh has presented and demonstrated his research at public events and exhibitions, including the Wellcome Collection's "Superhuman" exhibition, the London Science Museum, Science & Cocktails (Copenhagen), the British Neuroscience Association Festival of Neuroscience, university scientific societies in Oxford and Cambridge, and Casa Macaya (Barcelona).

Selected public talks and interviews are available online, including invited presentations on brain stimulation and personalised neurointervention.
