= Dysfunctional impulsivity =

Dysfunctional impulsivity is a type of impulsivity that is associated with a tendency to make quick decisions when this type of decision-making is non-optimal. This differs from functional impulsivity which is a tendency to make quick decisions where this is optimal. As dysfunctional impulsivity is often associated with a failure to consider the consequences of one’s behavior, it can often lead to life difficulties.

== Dickman Impulsivity Inventory ==
The distinction between functional and dysfunctional impulsivity was suggested by Scott J. Dickman in an article published in 1990. Before this, impulsivity was considered a complex construct that was made up of several different aspects. The Dickman Inventory classifies impulsivity into functional and dysfunctional categories.

Many of the previously used impulsivity scales have been significantly correlated to measures of dysfunctional impulsivity. These include the impulsiveness scale of Eysenck’s Impulsivity Inventory (part of the Eysenck Personality Questionnaire) as well as the Barratt Impulsiveness Scale. Many of the questions used in the Dickman Impulsivity Inventory mirror those used on past questionnaires, and are used to assess overall impulsivity. Of the 23 questions on the Dickman Impulsivity Inventory, 12 of the items are used to measure dysfunctional impulsivity. This includes questions such as “I often get into trouble because I don’t think before I act” as well as “I often say and do things without considering the consequences” This scale has been adapted for use in children with similar results: clear distinctions between functional and dysfunctional impulsivity. It has also been translated into several languages, yielding similar results

== Related constructs ==
Dysfunctional impulsivity is associated with both disorderliness and a tendency to ignore hard facts before making a decision. Individuals who are high in dysfunctional impulsivity are more likely to be punished for their behaviors. Psychopathy, aggression, a tendency to participate in sexual behavior outside of an established relationship, and a history of violent behavior have all been significantly associated with dysfunctional impulsivity. Individuals high in dysfunctional impulsivity have been shown to have slight deficits in executive functioning. Delay discounting has been shown to be related to both dysfunctional and functional impulsivity.

=== Substance abuse ===
Impulsivity is significantly correlated with individuals being at a greater risk for substance abuse. Several studies have furthered this association to specifically relate dysfunctional impulsivity to this tendency.

Binge drinkers were found to have significantly higher scores of dysfunctional impulsivity compared to control groups. The same study found no difference in levels of functional impulsivity between groups, indicating that dysfunctional impulsivity was the version of impulsivity that led to substance abuse. This relationship with dysfunctional impulsivity has also been found in regards to cigarette smoking. Higher levels of dysfunctional impulsivity have been related to difficulty restraining oneself from smoking in inappropriate places, smoking without being aware of doing so, and overall craving for cigarettes. Dysfunctional impulsivity scores have also been found to be higher in heroin users and addicts overall when compared to non-drug abusing control groups.
