= Functional impulsivity =

Functional impulsivity is a tendency to make quick decisions when it is optimal and beneficial. This impulsivity is in contrast with dysfunctional impulsivity, which is a tendency to make quick decisions when it is not optimal. Although both types can be associated with inaccurate results, functional impulsivity is often considered a point of pride because it can help individuals take full advantage of opportunities.

== Dickman Impulsivity Inventory ==
Functional impulsivity was first distinguished from dysfunctional impulsivity in a study performed by Scott J. Dickman in 1990. Although impulsivity has always been understood to have many different facets, Dickman showed two varieties that were significantly unrelated to one another. Before this research, impulsivity had commonly been considered a negative trait that could lead to problems in life. This research demonstrated that a specific type of impulsivity could be optimal and considered a positive trait.

The Dickman Impulsivity Inventory was developed to distinguish between trait functional and dysfunctional impulsivity. This inventory contains 63 items, 17 of which pertain specifically to functional impulsivity. This includes answer seeking propositions such as "I like to take part in really fast paced conversations, where you don't have much time to think before you speak" and "I am good at taking advantage of unexpected opportunities, where you have to do something immediately or lose your chance".

Before the Dickman Impulsivity Inventory, many of the measures of impulsivity related specifically to dysfunctional impulsivity. For instance, the only measure on the Eysenck Personality Questionnaire that was directly related to functional impulsivity measured venturesomeness. The Dickman Impulsivity Inventory has been translated into many languages and a children's version has been developed. Each scale has found a significant difference between functional and dysfunctional impulsivity.

== Related constructs ==
Functional impulsivity is related to enthusiasm, adventurousness, activity, extraversion, and narcissism. This is likely because individuals with high functional impulsivity are shown to have enhanced executive functioning overall. Also, high levels of this trait have been associated with higher professional success in NFL players, who also exhibit a smaller probability of experiencing negative consequences.

Although high trait impulsivity has long been associated with substance abuse, several studies have found that relates only to dysfunctional impulsivity and not to functional impulsivity. Functional impulsivity has been shown to have no effect on binge drinking. In fact, it has actually been shown that individuals who are low in functional impulsivity will have more intense cravings for cigarettes as well as for heroin and opiates.
