= Numerical Stroop effect =

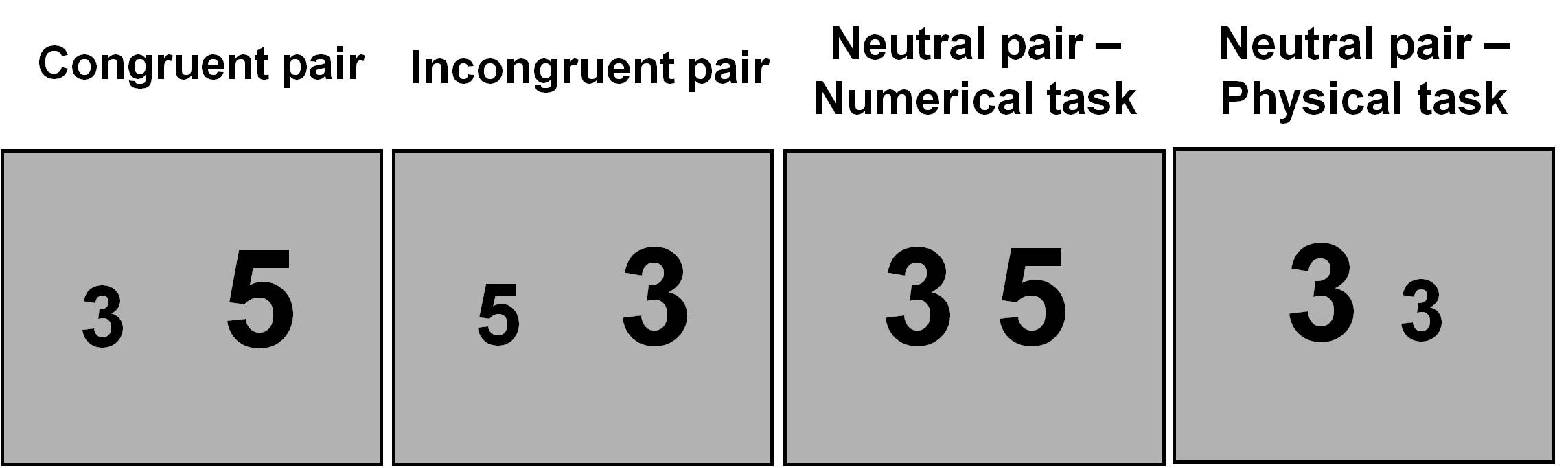
Example of the different conditions: congruent, incongruent and neutral trials

The numerical Stroop effect, a concept rooted in cognitive psychology, refers to the interference that occurs when individuals are asked to compare numerical values or physical sizes of digits presented together. The effect arises when there is a mismatch—or incongruity—between the numerical value and the physical size of the digits. For example, comparing a physically larger "3" and a smaller "5" can result in slower reaction times, as the brain encounters conflicting information between size and value. Conversely, response times are faster when the size and value align, such as a large "5" and a small "3".

This phenomenon is conceptually linked to the traditional Stroop effect, which involves interference between word meaning and font color. However, unlike the standard Stroop effect—where the interference is asymmetrical—the numerical Stroop effect exhibits a more balanced pattern. Both irrelevant size and irrelevant numerical values can interfere with task performance, indicating that numerical and physical size processing occur in parallel. The numerical Stroop effect also highlights the automatic nature of number processing, which can persist even when participants are explicitly instructed to ignore one dimension (e.g., size).

Studies using functional magnetic resonance imaging (fMRI) and electroencephalography (EEG) have demonstrated that brain regions such as the intraparietal sulcus are crucial for processing this effect, with heightened activation observed during incongruent trials. The effect is further modulated by individual cognitive development, as children may respond differently depending on their familiarity with numerical symbols. Research into the numerical Stroop effect has implications for understanding the neural basis of numerical cognition and contributes to broader studies on cognitive interference and brain function.

== Original experiments ==
Besner and Coltheart (1979) asked participants to compare values and ignore the sizes of the digits (i.e., the numerical task). They reported that the irrelevant sizes slowed down responding when sizes were incongruent with the values of the digits. Henik and Tzelgov (1982) examined not only the numerical task but also the physical task. The numerical Stroop effect was found in both tasks. Moreover, when the two dimensions were congruent, responding was facilitated (relative to neutral trials) and when the two dimensions were incongruent, responding was slower (relative to neutral trials).

== Experimental findings ==
The original Stroop effect is asymmetrical - color responses are slowed down by irrelevant words but word reading is commonly not affected by irrelevant colors. Unlike the Stroop effect, the numerical Stroop effect is symmetrical – irrelevant sizes affect the comparisons of values and irrelevant values affect comparisons of sizes. The latter gave rise to the suggestion that values are processed automatically because this occurs even when responding to values is much slower than responding to sizes.The size of the numerical Stroop effect is modulated by various factors, including the proportion of incongruent trials, such that a higher proportion of incongruent trials leads to a smaller congruency effect. Moreover, processing values depends on familiarity with the numerical symbolic system. Accordingly, young children may show the size effect in numerical comparisons but not the effect of values in physical size comparisons.

== Neuroanatomy ==
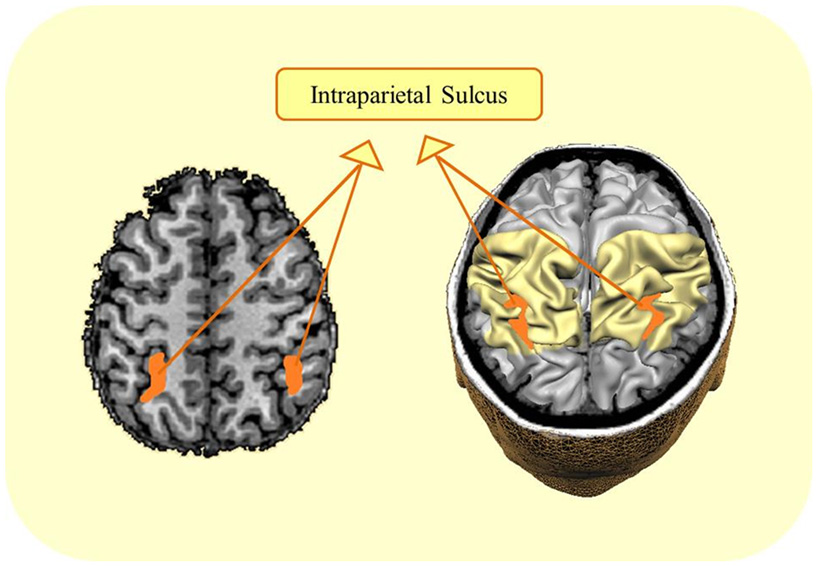
The intraparietal sulcus - a brain area that is active when the numerical stroop effect occurs

Functional magnetic resonance imaging (fMRI) studies have pinpointed the brain regions that are involved in the numerical Stroop effect. In these studies the most consistent finding was the involvement of the parietal cortex, with increased activation for incongruent in comparison to congruent trials. When a neutral condition was included, it was observed that the bilateral parietal lobes were the only regions that were involved in both facilitation and interference. Electroencephalography (EEG) studies have indicated that the amplitude or the latency of the P300 wave is modulated as a function of the congruity effect. This means that when looking at amplitude, the difference between the amplitude of the congruent and incongruent condition is observed 300 ms after the presentation of the digits. In addition, behavioral, physiological, and computational studies support the view, although not unanimously, that the conflict between congruent and incongruent conditions is observed up to the response level, and is dependent on the developmental stage of the participant.

The above-mentioned studies allow inferring the neural correlate of the numerical Stroop effect. However, they do not allow concluding whether parietal lobe function is critical for this effect. Brain stimulation studies that use techniques such as transcranial magnetic stimulation or transcranial direct current stimulation allow modulating parietal lobe function and inferring its role. These studies have suggested that the right parietal lobe in particular is necessary for the numerical Stroop effect, albeit stimulation of the right parietal lobe might affect other connected brain regions. Moreover, work with acquired acalculia suggested involvement of the left parietal lobe in the numerical Stroop effect. This effect is commonly reduced in cases of brain damage to the left intraparietal sulcus.
