= Avishai Henik =

Israeli neurocognitive psychologist (born 1945)

- אבישי הניק
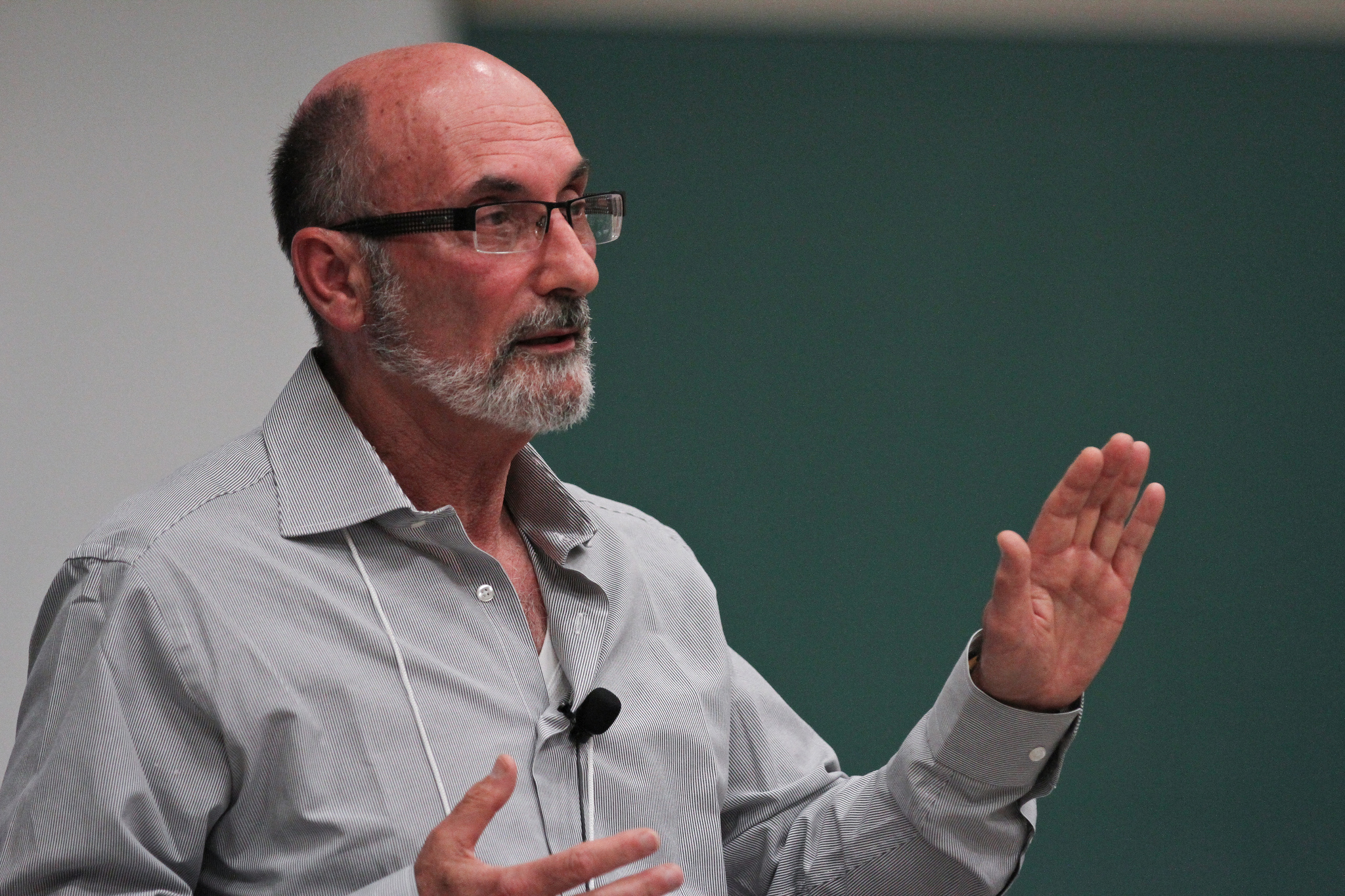
- Henik in 2016
- Born: 1945 (age 80–81); Tel Aviv, Israel
- Awards: European Research Council (ERC) Advanced Researcher Grant
- Scientific career
- Fields: Psychology
- Institutions: Ben-Gurion University of the Negev
- Doctoral advisor: Daniel Kahneman
- Doctoral students: Roi Cohen Kadosh
- Website: in.bgu.ac.il/en/Labs/CNL/Pages/staff/AvishaiHenik.aspx/

Avishai Henik (Hebrew: אבישי הניק; born 1945) is an Israeli neurocognitive psychologist who works at Ben-Gurion University of the Negev (BGU). Henik studies voluntary and automatic (non-voluntary/reflexive) processes involved in cognitive operations. He characterizes automatic processes (in various areas of research), and clarifies their importance, the relationship between automatic and voluntary processes, and their neural underpinnings. Most of his work involves research with human participants and in recent years, he has been working with Archerfish to examine evolutionary aspects of various cognitive functions.

== Biography ==
Avishai Henik was born in Tel Aviv in 1945. He received his undergraduate degree in psychology and education from Ben-Gurion University of the Negev in 1971. He then moved to the Hebrew University of Jerusalem to study for his MA and PhD degrees under the supervision of Nobel Laureate Daniel Kahneman. He received his PhD in 1979. In 1980, Henik received a Rothschild post-doctoral fellowship and spent two years in Eugene, Oregon, in the laboratory of Michael I. Posner, considered a leading pioneer in building the field of cognitive neuroscience, and the neuropsychology laboratory led by Michael I. Posner and Oscar S.M. Marin in Portland, Oregon, U.S.A.

== Academic career ==
Henik began as a lecturer at Ben-Gurion University of the Negev in 1979 and was promoted to Senior Lecturer in 1984, then to Associate Professor in 1992, and a full professor in 1996. Ben-Gurion University of the Negev endowed him with the Zlotowski Chair in Cognitive Neuropsychology in 1999 and a Distinguished Professor degree in 2014. He is currently continuing his research as an emeritus distinguished professor.

Henik heads the Cognitive Neuropsychology Laboratory. His work is multidisciplinary—he studies mental operations, which serve as building blocks for a given cognitive function, as well as the brain tissues involved in these operations. His early works focused on single word processing and the Stroop effect and later on visual spatial attention, numerical cognition, dyscalculia, emotions, and synesthesia. He has written over 200 articles, in addition to an edited book entitled, Continuous Issues in Numerical Cognition: How Many or How Much.

Henik was the instigator and chair of a multidisciplinary think-tank sponsored by the Israeli Ministry of Education whose function was to better understand the crossroads where neuroscience, cognitive science, and education meet. The aim was to identify developments in the field and their ramifications for education. In 2012, Henik won a European Research Council (ERC) Advanced Researcher Grant to study the role of size perception and evaluation in numerical cognition. In this research, he focused on behavioral studies of the typical and atypical development of numerical concepts, imaging studies, and work on lower animals (i.e., Archerfish, which can evaluate size but do not have a cerebral cortex that is thought to be central in arithmetic) and examination of computational aspects of development through evolutionary algorithms.

=== Attention ===
Henik started his work on attention under the supervision of Daniel Kahneman in the middle of the 1970s. Kahneman and Henik published two papers on selective attention, one of which has been heavily cited throughout the years. Since then, Henik studied the neurocognitive mechanisms that underlie orienting of visual-spatial attention and selective attention. Studies conducted in his laboratory and collaboration with other researchers (e.g., Robert Rafal) documented the distinction between the involuntary-exogenous and the voluntary-endogenous attentional systems, the cortical and subcortical neural structures that subserve these systems, and developmental trajectories in attention. His studies, on patients as well as the archerfish, documented the role of subcortical structures (e.g., superior colliculus) in inhibition of return (IOR). His research on selective attention uses a range of tasks like the Stroop, flanker, and the stop-signal task, which require selection and control over habitual responding. This research led Henik to study cognitive control and executive functions.

=== Cognitive control and emotional self-regulation ===
Henik's research in this area aims at understanding the development of goal-directed behavior and self-regulation. Research in his laboratory has shown that cognitive control and emotional regulation could work in top-down or bottom-up pathways. Emotions, commonly thought to involve subcortical structures (e.g., amygdala), can be regulated by cognitive control (that involves higher brain structures in the cerebral cortex) and are affected by training. Moreover, attentional alerting (thought to involve subcortical brain structures) was found to modulate cognitive control / executive functions.

=== Numerical cognition ===
Henik studies the building blocks of numerical cognition and developmental dyscalculia—a specific deficiency in arithmetic that is similar in nature and prevalence to dyslexia. Together with Joseph Tzelgov, Henik designed the numerical Stroop task and showed (a) the intimate relationship between sizes and numbers, and (b) the fact that numerical values are processed automatically even when completely irrelevant to the task. In subsequent years, it was found that performance in the numerical Stroop task depends on knowledge of the numerical system, involves specific brain areas (i.e., the cortical intraparietal sulcus), and is compromised in developmental dyscalculia and acalculia. In recent years Henik pointed out the importance of non-countable dimensions (e.g., which object is larger in size, how much water is in the glass) to numerical cognition. In recent publications, Henik and colleagues suggested the existence of a magnitude sense rather than a number sense, with the former based on the ability to perceive and evaluate non-countable dimensions (e.g., size). Henik and colleagues edited three books in numerical cognition. One dealt with the role of continuous dimensions, one with heterogeneity of functions involved in numerical cognition, and one with learning and education in mathematical cognition.

=== Synesthesia ===
It has been suggested that synesthesia can serve as a window to understanding crucial issues in object perception such as feature binding, and that it documents cross-talk between supposedly separate systems (e.g., vision and audition). In studies of synesthesia, Henik and his colleagues combined behavioral and brain imaging techniques as well as harnessed other techniques (e.g., hypnosis) in order to examine fundamental issues in the field.

== Awards and recognition ==
- 2017 - Excellent Mentor Prize, awarded by the Israel Society for Neuroscience (ISFN) for exceptional mentoring in neuroscience.
- 2018 - Humboldt Research Award, awarded by the Alexander von Humboldt Foundation, in recognition of accomplishments in research and teaching.
- 2020 - FENS-Kavli Network of Excellence Mentoring Prize 2020, awarded by the Federation of European Neuroscience Societies and the Kavli Foundation scholars network for demonstrated leadership in fostering the careers of neuroscientists.
