= John Ridley Stroop =

American psychologist

- Born: March 21, 1897; Rutherford County, Tennessee
- Died: September 1, 1973 (aged 76); Nashville, Tennessee
- Resting place: Woodlawn Cemetery; Nashville, Tennessee
- Other names: J. R. Stroop
- Education: Ph.D. in Experimental Psychology
- Alma mater: Peabody College
- Occupation: Teacher
- Years active: 1921–1968
- Organization: David Lipscomb College
- Known for: Stroop effect
- Spouse(s): Zelma Dunn, great niece of Margaret Zellner, wife of David Lipscomb
- Children: 3 sons

John Ridley Stroop (/struːp/; March 21, 1897 – September 1, 1973), better known as J. Ridley Stroop, was an American psychologist whose research in cognition and interference continues to be considered by some as the gold standard in attentional studies and profound enough to continue to be cited for relevance into the 21st century. However, Christianity was the real passion of his life; psychology was simply an occupation.

== Early life ==
John Ridley Stroop was born in the rural community of Hall's Hill, outside Murfreesboro in Rutherford County, Tennessee. In poor health as an infant, his family thought that he was not going to live long so he was spared part of the heaviest farm work. Stroop was brilliant in his local county school at Kitrell, finishing the first of his class. He attended David Lipscomb High School in Nashville, graduating in 1919. Stroop then began to study at David Lipscomb College, then a two-year junior college, in Nashville, Tennessee, an institution where he would later return as a faculty member after his university doctoral work. Two years later, in 1921, he obtained his diploma from Lipscomb, graduating first in his class.

On December 23, 1921, Stroop married Zelma Dunn (1899-1988) with whom he had 3 sons. Zelma was the great-niece of Margaret Zellner, wife of David Lipscomb.

== Academic career ==
Stroop spent his academic career at George Peabody College in Nashville while also teaching courses at David Lipscomb College. He received his B.S. degree in 1924 and his M.S. in 1925.

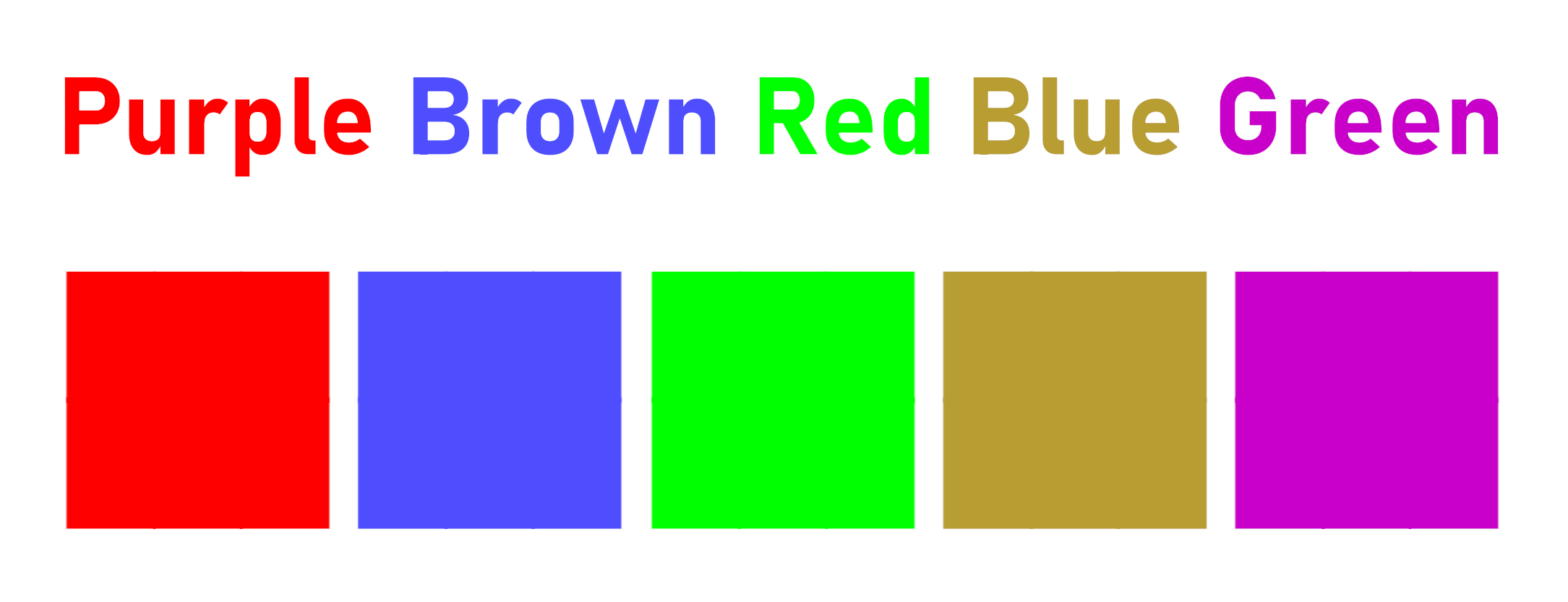
Stroop's research into what became known as the Stroop effect showed that it takes more time to name the color of a word where the word does not correspond to that color (conflict), than to name the color of a square (no conflict).

Stroop's doctoral studies at Peabody were focused on Experimental Psychology with a minor in Educational Psychology. His research at the Jesup Psychological Laboratory and his dissertation were under the direction of Joseph Peterson. Stroop's research was built on studies in the early 1880s by Cattell under the direction of Wilhelm Wundt to measure mental processes involving naming objects as well as reading object names. The elegance of Stroop's research was to apply experimental rigor and a clarity of explanation that led to identification of the tested processes with his name. Stroop developed a color-word task to demonstrate interference between reading an object's name and naming an object, and explained some of its psychological characteristics, which were later named the Stroop effect. Soon after producing his dissertation on the color-word task to obtain his Ph.D, Stroop left experimental psychology. He produced only two other papers related to the color-word task.

After obtaining his doctorate, Stroop worked briefly for the Tennessee Educational Commission and also for the Tennessee Polytechnic Institute, now Tennessee Technological University. He soon returned to David Lipscomb College, where he served as Registrar for eleven years, and then as chair of the Psychology Department from 1948 to 1964. Stroop continued to teach psychology and Biblical studies until he retired in 1967. He served one year as dean of Ohio Valley College in Parkersburg, West Virginia before returning to Lipscomb as Emeritus Professor of Biblical Studies until his death on September 1, 1973.

== Bibliography ==
Works he authored and edited were in the field of psychology and religion.

=== Psychology theses and dissertations ===
- A study of the inaccuracy of scoring handwriting by handwriting scales (1925)
- Studies of interference in serial verbal reactions (1935)

=== Psychology articles ===
- Is the judgment of the group better than that of the average member of the group? (1932; Journal of Experimental Psychology, 15, 550–562)
- Studies of interference in serial verbal reactions (1935; Journal of Experimental Psychology, 18, 643–662)
- The basis of Ligon's theory (1935; American Journal of Psychology, 47, 499–504)
- Factors affecting speed in serial verbal reactions (1938; Psychological Monographs, 50, 38–48)

=== Religion works ===
- Why do people not see the Bible alike? (1949)
- God's plan and me. Book 1, Jesus’ mission and method (1950)
- God's Plan and Me, How to Inherit Eternal Life (1954)
- Syllabus on later Hebrew history (1960)
- God's Plan and Me (1950–1961)
- The gospel in context (1961)
- The church of the Bible (1962)
- Syllabus on Paul's briefer epistles and the general epistles (1965)
- Restoration ideas on church organization (1966)
- Galatians : the sufficiency of the gospel without the law (1971)
- The superiority of the Gospel over the Law : (Hebrews) (1972)
- Romans : righteousness through faith (1973)
- What shall we do with the new Bible (Revised Standard Version)
- The faith that saves (1950–1970)
- Does love demand or excuse? (1950–1970)
- Syllabus on the epistles of Paul to the churches.
