= European Society for Cognitive Psychology =

Academic research society

- Formation: 1985
- Type: Professional association
- Members: 1000+
- 2018 president: Klaus Oberauer, Prof., U Zürich
- Key people: President elect: Prof. Andrea Kiesel, U Freiburg
- Website: http://escop.eu

The European Society for Cognitive Psychology (ESCoP) is one of the primary societies for scientific psychology in Europe. Members of ESCoP specialize in research in Cognitive Psychology and related disciplines, studying topics such as working memory, attention, language processing, bilingualism, perception, and many more. ESCoP was an associate member of the European Federation of Psychologists' Associations (EFPA), and organized joint symposia with the Association for Psychological Science (APS).

== Mission ==
ESCOP's mission is "the furtherance of scientific enquiry within the field of Cognitive Psychology and related subjects, particularly with respect to collaboration and exchange of information between researchers in different European countries".

== Membership ==
ESCOP is a mid-size Society with some 1000 members, across a range of European countries and beyond. There are four types of membership within the Society: associate members (postgraduates or postdoctoral researchers who are developing their research career), full members, honorary members and retired members.

== History ==
In 1985 five leading figures in the field of Cognitive Psychology (Alan Baddeley, Paul Bertelson, Janet Jackson, John Michon, Wolfgang Prinz) founded ‘ESCoP’ – the European Society for Cognitive Psychology. The society was established as a means to communicate with others working in Cognitive Psychology. The inaugural meeting of ESCoP took place in Nijmegen, the Netherlands, on September 9–12, 1985. This first meeting was on an invitation only basis. ESCoP was registered in accordance with Dutch law as a foundation (Stichting).

== Meetings ==
The conference of the Society is organized at least once every two years. Conferences have been held in: Nijmegen (The Netherlands) 1985, Madrid (Spain) 1987, Cambridge (UK) 1988, Como (Italy) 1990, Paris (France) 1992, Elsinore (Denmark) 1993, Lisbon (Portugal) 1994, Rome (Italy) 1995, Würzburg (Germany) 1996, Jerusalem (Israel) 1998, Ghent (Belgium) 1999, Edinburgh (UK) 2001, Granada (Spain) 2003, Leiden (The Netherlands) 2005, Marseille (France) 2007, Kraków (Poland) 2009, Donostia-San Sebastian (Spain) 2011, Budapest (Hungary) 2013, Paphos (Cyprus) 2015, Potsdam (Germany) 2017, Tenerife (Spain) 2019.

== Journals ==
Journal of Cognition, ESCoP's official peer-reviewed journal, is published open access by Ubiquity Press. The journal is currently edited by Candice Morey. The journal publishes reports of empirical work, theoretical contributions, and reviews of the literature in all areas of cognitive Psychology, including applied cognitive psychology.

== Awards ==
ESCoP offers three awards and multiple funding options for the most dynamic members of the Society. Please visit ESCoP Website for more information.

- Broadbent Prize:

The Prize is granted every two years to an outstanding senior scientist specializing in Cognitive Psychology.

- Bertelson Award:

The Award is granted every two years to an outstanding young scientist for making a significant contribution to European Cognitive Psychology.

- Early Career Publication Award:

The Award is given for the best article accepted for publication each year. The applicant (PhD student or post-doc within a year of receipt of the PhD) has to be the first author of the article and a member of ESCoP.
