= Dual-task paradigm =

A dual-task paradigm is a procedure in experimental neuropsychology that requires an individual to perform two tasks simultaneously, in order to compare performance with single-task conditions. When performance scores on one and/or both tasks are lower when they are done simultaneously compared to separately, these two tasks interfere with each other, and it is assumed that both tasks compete for the same class of information processing resources in the brain.

For instance, reciting poetry while riding a bike are two tasks that can be performed just as well separately as simultaneously. However, reciting poetry while writing an essay should deteriorate performance on at least one of these two tasks, because they interfere with each other.

The interpretation of dual-task paradigms follows the view that human processing resources are limited and shareable and that they can be subdivided into several classes.

Neuroimaging research suggests that dual-task performance involves several areas of the brain associated with attention, movement, and cognitive control. Dual-tasking and task switching share some of these brain mechanisms but also show different patterns of brain activity, suggesting that the two forms of multitasking place partly different demands on the brain.
