= Emotional Stroop test =

- Purpose: assess emotions

In psychology, the emotional Stroop task is used as an information-processing approach to assessing emotions. Like the standard Stroop effect, the emotional Stroop test works by examining the response time of the participant to name colors of words presented to them. Unlike the traditional Stroop effect, the words presented either relate to specific emotional states or disorders, or they are neutral (e.g., "watch", "bottle", "sky"). For example, depressed participants will be slower to say the color of depressing words rather than non-depressing words. Non-clinical subjects have also been shown to name the color of an emotional word (e.g., "war", "cancer", "kill") slower than naming the color of a neutral word (e.g., "clock", "lift", "windy"). Negative words selected for the emotional Stroop task can be either preselected by researchers or taken from the lived experiences of participants completing the task. Typically, when asked to identify the color of the words presented to them, participants reaction times for negative emotional words is slower than the identification of the color of neutral words. While it has been shown that those in negative moods tend to take longer to respond when presented with negative word stimuli, this is not always the case when participants are presented with words that are positive or more neutral in tone.

While the emotional Stroop task and the classic Stroop effect elicit similar behavioral outcomes (a slowing in response times to colored words), these tests engage different mechanisms of interference. The classic Stroop test creates a conflict between an incongruent color and word (the word "RED" in font color blue) but the emotional Stroop involves only emotional and neutral words—color does not affect slowing because it does not conflict with word meaning. In other words, studies show the same effects of slowing for emotional words relative to neutral even if all the words are black. Thus, the emotional Stroop does not involve an effect of conflict between a word meaning and a color of text, but rather appears to capture attention and slow response time due to the emotional relevance of the word for the individual. Both the standard Stroop effect and the emotional Stoop task have high test-retest reliability.

There are variations to the emotional Stroop task; participants may not always be asked to identify the color of the word presented to them, but instead they may be asked to respond to other stimuli present.

== Clinical Applications ==
Both the classic and the emotional Stroop tasks involve the need to suppress responses to distracting word information, while selectively maintaining attention on the color of the word to complete the task. However, the emotional Stroop task has been used broadly in clinical studies using emotional words related to a particular individual's area of concern, such as alcohol-related words for someone who is alcoholic, or words involving a particular phobia for someone with anxiety or phobic disorders. The emotional Stroop task has been used to assess the risk for suicide college students. It has been examined in relation to veterans with PTSD; those with PTSD had slower response times to words related to the disorder than neutral or unrelated negative words when compared to veterans without PTSD.

The emotional Stroop task has also been used to examine participants with Body Dysmorphic Disorder

== Gender & Age Differences ==
It has been shown that there are differences in performance on the emotional Stoop task when comparing across genders and age groups. However, findings examining these differences are mixed. For example, in a study examining how older adults and younger adults differ in speed of responses on an emotional Stroop task containing both emotional words and faces, both younger and older adults took longer to respond to stimuli when asked to identify positive words paired with negative faces. This suggests that there is no difference among older and younger adults. Other studies have found different results, with results suggesting that older adults are more affected by negative words in the emotional Stoop task than younger adults. In terms of gender differences between men and women, it has been shown that females perform worse than men when it comes to responding to aggressive words but only marginally so.

== Controversy notice ==
The emotional Stroop test requires naming the colour of a word without reading the word as described earlier; however a flaw in this study design was investigated by Larsen & Balota, 2006. This study showed that slower word recognition cannot be solely attributed to whether a word is emotional or not, and that lexical features could also explain this slowing. All emotion words used in the published studies evaluated were significantly longer in length, less frequently used, and had smaller orthographic neighbourhoods than control words. Thus the contribution of lexical characteristics to results of an emotional Stroop test should be considered when used in research.

Also, Mathey & Gobin, 2010 found that, though a word's emotional valence influences visual identification, its orthographic neighbours are also a factor in processing speed; they suggest further investigation on this issue. A primary finding of the study was that words with a negative, higher-frequency orthographic neighbour were recognised more slowly than those with a neutral one. This once again is an additional factor that should be controlled for when using an emotional Stroop test in research.

== See also ==
- Cognition
- Cognitive bias
- Cognitive neuropsychology
- Neuropsychology
