= Five-choice serial-reaction time task =

The Five-choice serial-reaction time task (5CSRTT) is a laboratory behavioral task used in psychological research to assess visuospatial attention and motor impulsivity in animals. The task takes place within an operant chamber equipped with at least five holes (apertures) that can illuminate, and a food tray to deliver reward. The 5CSRTT requires the animal (typically a rat, although mice can also be used) to correctly identify which of the five apertures has been briefly illuminated, via a nose poke, in order to receive a sugar reward. The difficulty of the task is controlled by the length of time the aperture is illuminated: a shorter illumination time requires the animal to pay greater attention, and thus is more difficult (as shown by decreased accuracy). Between every trial, there is also a short interval wherein the animal must withhold all responses, and any responding during this interval is met with a brief time-out and recorded as a failure of inhibitory control.

The 5CSRTT was initially designed by Trevor Robbins and colleagues in the early 1980s as an analogue of the human continuous performance task. Because the 5CSRTT has separate measures of attention, impulsivity, and reaction times, it has proven useful in the pre-clinical study of the treatment of diagnoses such as attention-deficit/hyperactivity disorder, and is also a precursor to modern rodent models of gambling and decision making.

== See also ==
- Stop-signal reaction-time task
- Animal testing on rodents
