= Barratt Impulsiveness Scale =

Widely used measure of impulsiveness

The Barratt Impulsiveness Scale (BIS) is a widely used measure of impulsiveness. It includes 30 items that are scored to yield six first-order factors (attention, motor, self-control, cognitive complexity, perseverance, and cognitive instability impulsiveness) and three second-order factors (attentional, motor, and non-planning impulsiveness).

The BIS is the most widely used self-report measure of impulsive personality traits. As of June 2008, Web of Knowledge (an academic citation indexing and search service) tallied 457 journal citations of the 1995 article which defined the factor structure of the 11th version of the Barratt Impulsiveness Scale. Although initially developed in the United States, the BIS-11 has been applied widely around the world, including Australia, Belgium, Brazil, Canada, China, Estonia, France, Germany, Greece, Israel, Italy, Japan, Korea, Netherlands, Scotland, Spain, Switzerland, Taiwan, Turkey, and the United Kingdom.

The first version of the scale, the BIS-1, was released in 1959. The current version, the BIS-11, was released in 1995.

== Scoring ==
The BIS-11 is a 30-item self-report questionnaire that is scored to yield a total score, three second-order factors, and six first-order factors. The questions are published in the 1995 references article. The following is a list of the items contributing to each factor score.

Second-order factors	Item content
Attentional:	5, 6, 9*, 11, 20*, 24, 26, 28
Motor:	2, 3, 4, 16, 17, 19, 21, 22, 23, 25, 30*
Nonplanning:	1*, 7*, 8*, 10*, 12*, 13*, 14, 15*, 18, 27, 29*

First-order factors	Item content
Attention:	5, 9*, 11, 20*, 28
Motor:	2, 3, 4, 17, 19, 22, 25
Self-Control:	1*, 7*, 8*, 12*, 13*, 14
Cognitive Complexity:	10*, 15*, 18, 27, 29*
Perseverance:	16, 21, 23, 30*
Cognitive Instability:	6, 24, 26

* means reverse scored item

== Validity ==
Patton et al. reported internal consistency coefficients for the BIS-11 total score that range from 0.79 to 0.83 for separate populations of under-graduates, substance-abuse patients, general psychiatric patients, and prison inmates.

== Modified versions ==
Short versions of the BIS-11 have been developed. The BIS-15 developed by Spinella includes 15 of the original 30-item BIS-11 and has been used in several other languages such as German, Spanish, French, Thai, and Kannada. There is also an Italian version who has been labelled BIS-15 developed by Maggi and colleagues but shares only 12 items with Spinella's BIS-15. The BIS-Brief includes eight items of the original 30-item BIS-11.
