= Texas Mental Health Code =

Mental health development in Texas

The Texas Mental Health Code was passed as House bill 6 by the 55th Texas legislative session in May 1957 and went into effect on January 1, 1958. The purpose of the Texas Mental Health Code was to provide equitable, humane, and accessible treatment measures for mentally ill individuals while minimizing to the greatest extent possible any logistical obstacles, financial expenses, and traumatic responses to this care and maintaining the dignity and human rights of mentally ill individuals. This was the first statue that defined the state's responsibility for mental health services.

== Development ==
Mental health outreach efforts in Texas to this point had been irregular, disorganized, and largely spearheaded by individuals and nonprofit organizations.

U.S. involvement in World War II resulted in an onslaught of war-related demands for mental health services. The passage of the National Mental Health Act (1946) and the subsequent establishment of the National Institute of Mental Health (1949) set a foundation for national-level involvement, but little had been done at the state level.

In 1955, the Texas Research League, a nonprofit corporation that sought to elicit change primarily through funded research ventures in various programs and operations of the Texas government, produced a 13-volume study on the state of the mental health policies and procedures set in place by the Board for Texas State Hospitals and Special Schools (BTSHSS). This study served as an acknowledgement of the increase in awareness, organization, and facilitation of mental health care measures that had already been taken and as an optimistic roadmap for the future. The development of a state mental health code was a top priority outlined in this study, and the BTSHSS called upon the Hogg Foundation for Mental Health at the University of Texas at Austin to take initiative in drafting this code.

The Hogg Foundation awarded a grant to the University of Texas School of Law to begin the Texas Mental Health Code Drafting Project. This project was led by Millard Rudd, Professor of Law. Authors and editors included other UT law school graduates as well as Robert Lee Sutherland and Bert Kruger Smith, well-known advocates in the field at the time. During the development process, Texas Governor John Connally offered his unwavering support for the code.

In efforts to accumulate additional legislative support, project leaders sought the involvement of William C. Menninger, a psychiatrist well known for his mental health advocacy. Menninger delivered a speech on February 12, 1957, in which he emphasized the importance of personalized treatment methods for mental health and asserted that the outcomes for most mentally ill individuals were contingent upon the receipt of proper care by trained psychologists, psychiatrists, and social workers. This speech was extremely well received. The Texas legislature in attendance gave Menninger a standing ovation, and the speech received positive press coverage.

In May 1957, the Texas Mental Health Code was enacted as Texas House Bill 6. It went into effect on January 1, 1958.

== Impact ==
Prior to the passage of this bill, living conditions for those in mental hospitals were often undesirable. Children and adults were housed together, individuals with developmental disabilities were housed with those with mental illnesses, facilities were frequently unsanitary and overcrowded, and no distinctions were made amongst types and severity of mental illnesses. The disorganization and mismanagement of these facilities was not regulated and often resulted in additional mental distress for those involved.

The Code outlined a process for voluntary admission to mental hospitals in an effort to protect patients’ privacy and autonomy and to reduce the negative stigma surrounding these institutions so that more individuals would feel comfortable to seek professional help for themselves.

Where previous rhetoric referred to an aggregate of mental health sufferers, the language used in this bill placed a new emphasis on the view of mentally ill individuals as individuals with human rights.

This passage of the Mental Health Code did not solve all problems or by any means represent the end of reform efforts in the field of mental health. The enactment of the Texas Mental Health Code reflected progress toward reform in the field and laid a foundation for further reform efforts to develop over the following decades. The next significant piece of legislation was the Texas Mental Health and Mental Retardation Act of 1965, which implemented more nuanced policies and standards for the treatment of individuals with mental afflictions.

Today, the Texas Mental Health Code exists under Title 7, “Mental Health and Intellectual Disability,” of the Texas Health and Safety Code. The basic principles and definitions in the code have been expanded slightly to narrow the scope of what constitutes a mental illness, specify types and levels of appropriate care, and introduce civil penalties for violations of the code. The last major update to the code was enacted by the 72nd Texas Legislature and made effective on September 1, 1991. The last minor amendment to the code concerning the allocation of state funds was made effective by Texas Senate bill 41 on January 1, 2022.
