= Stanley Yolles =

American psychiatrist

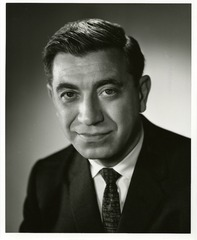

Director of the National Institute of Mental Health
- In office 1964–1970
- Preceded by: Robert H. Felix
- Succeeded by: Bertram S. Brown

Personal details
- Born: April 19, 1919 New York City, U.S.
- Died: January 12, 2001 (aged 81)
- Education: Brooklyn College; Harvard University; New York University College of Medicine

Stanley Fausst Yolles (April 19, 1919 - January 12, 2001) was an American psychiatrist who was head of the National Institute of Mental Health from 1964 to 1970. He resigned after publicly clashing with the Nixon administration over drug policy.

== Life ==
Yolles was born in New York City to Louis, who owned a dress factory, and Rose, a milliner. Both of his parents were Jewish immigrants from Galicia (at the time, part of Austria, but after World War I, Poland). He graduated from Brooklyn College in 1939, received his master's degree in parasitology from Harvard University in 1940 and graduated from New York University College of Medicine in 1950. During World War II he served with the United States Army Corps of Engineers as a parasitologist in Latin America, becoming associate director of the Army's Sector Epidemiological Laboratory in the British West Indies. After the war he was commissioned in the United States Public Health Service and did his residency at Public Health Service Hospital in Lexington, Kentucky. It was there when he decided to turn his focus away from infectious disease to psychiatry.

Yolles joined the National Institute of Mental Health in 1954 as a staff psychiatrist. He became associate director of the community services branch in 1955, and later director of community services. After becoming deputy director in 1963, he became director the following year after the retirement of Robert Felix.

In 1967, Yolles was part of the first mental health delegation to the USSR.

In 1968, Yolles wrote an introduction for the book Growing Up Straight: What Every Thoughtful Parent Should Know About Homosexuality, by Peter and Barbara Wyden. The book made claims that parents can prevent their children from becoming homosexual.

As director of the NIMH, Yolles spoke out against strict drug laws, saying that punishments for marijuana possession were worse than the crime in front of congressional committees. Angered by this, Richard Nixon removed Yolles from his position on June 2, 1970. Yolles responded with a letter of resignation that condemned Nixon for abandoning the mentally ill.

In 1971 Yolles was asked to create the department of psychiatry at the State University of New York at Stony Brook, which he headed until 1981. In 1982 he became emeritus status as professor of psychiatry at SUNY, Stony Brook.

== Awards and honors ==
At the time of his dismissal from NIMH, Yolles was assistant surgeon general and a rear admiral in the Public Health Service. He was also a recipient of the HEW's Meritorious Service Medal and the Distinguished Service Medal.

== Personal life ==
Yolles married Tamarath Knigin, whom he met at Brooklyn College. Also a physician in the PHS and an associate dean at Stoney Brook medical school, she died in 1985. He is survived by daughters Melanie Yolles of Manhattan and Dr. Jennifer C. Yolles of Syracuse, as well as three grandchildren.
