= Texas Mental Health and Mental Retardation Act of 1965 =

Act passed in Texas concerning mental health

The Texas Mental Health and Mental Retardation Act of 1965 was passed as House Bill 3 by the 59th Texas Legislature and signed into law by Texas Governor John Connally on April 5, 1965.

== History ==
Advocacy for mental health services in the United States has a brief and fragmented history. The term “mental hygiene” was first coined in 1843 by William Sweetzer.

In 1946, the National Mental Health Act established and funded the National Institute of Mental Health. To this point, mental health initiatives had been considered the responsibility of individual states, but after World War II there was an increase in advocacy for federal involvement.

== Development ==
In 1962 at the National Governor's Conference, a resolution was established for each state to develop its own comprehensive plan for mental health services. The United States Congress allocated $4.2 million as grants-in-aid to support the development of comprehensive mental health initiatives in each state.

The Texas State Department of Health instituted the Office of Mental Health Planning in February 1963, which supported an executive committee that consisted of four individuals. This committee's work was funded by a $180,000 grant from the National Institute of Mental Health. Controversy over whether or not to accept federal funds delayed the committee's first application to expand the size and scope of their efforts. In October 1963, the committee published “The Future is Now: Statewide and Community Planning for Mental Health Services,” a statement that called for increased public participation in the efforts to establish community-based resources in preventative care, diagnosis, treatment, and rehabilitative services across the state.

The General Planning Committee, also known as the Statewide Citizens Committee on Mental Health Program Planning, was composed of 116 citizens who began meeting regularly in January 1964. Many of those involved were professionals such as psychologists, psychiatrists, teachers, social workers, and ministers. Prominent figures involved with this committed included Wayne Holtzman, Bernice Milburn Moore, and Bert Kruger Smith. Private citizens with particular skillsets and concerns about mental health practices served on this committee as well. The committee members divided themselves into task forces and drafted the Texas Plan for Mental Health Services over the course of 1964.

On December 1, 1964, the 250-page Texas Plan for Mental Health Services was completed. The report included thirteen sections and focused on two major resolutions: the establishment of mental health centers in metropolitan areas and the developments of the Texas Department of Mental Health as a centralized authority.

The Texas Plan for Mental Health Services resulted in the enactment of House Bill 3, which was passed by the 59th Texas Legislature as the Texas Mental Health and Mental Retardation Act and signed into law on April 5, 1965.

== Impact ==
The Texas Mental Health and Mental Retardation Act experienced little to no controversy during its development and implementation and received primarily positive press coverage upon its publicization. The new law replaced the Board for Texas State Hospitals and Special Schools and combined several functioning entities under the Texas State Department of Health into a new agency called the Texas Department of Mental Health and Mental Retardation.

This act was revolutionary within the field of mental health on several fronts. It stated for the first time that epilepsy, senility, alcoholism, and intellectual disabilities are not qualified as mental illnesses. The code also allowed for voluntary admissions in addition to court-ordered admissions. Effective September 1, 2004, Texas House Bill 2292 (78th Legislature, 2003) merged twelve state health and human services agencies into five, which effectively abolished the Texas Department of Mental Health and Mental Retardation. This entity was replaced by the Texas Department of Aging and Disability Services and the Texas Department of State Health Services, a broader entity that provides statewide mental health services to the present day.
