= Bill for the Benefit of the Indigent Insane =

1854 proposed legislation for funding mental asylums

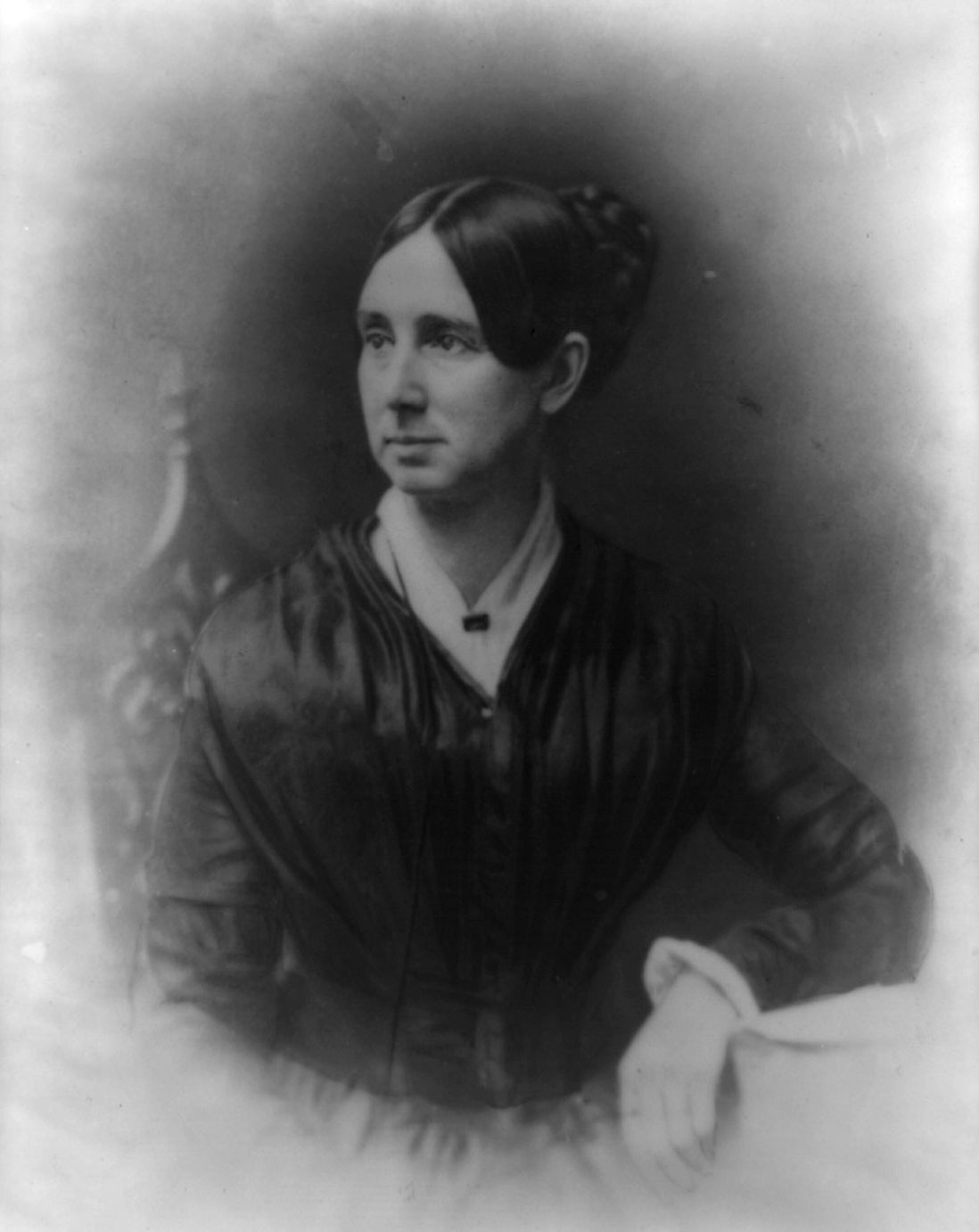
The bill was advocated by activist Dorothea Dix.

The Bill for the Benefit of the Indigent Insane (also called the Land-Grant Bill For Indigent Insane Persons, formally "An act making a grant of public lands to the several States for the benefit of indigent insane persons") was proposed legislation of the 33rd United States Congress that would have established psychiatric hospitals providing mental health treatment to impoverished individuals using federal land grants to state governments. The bill offered smaller land grants to support physically disabled Americans.

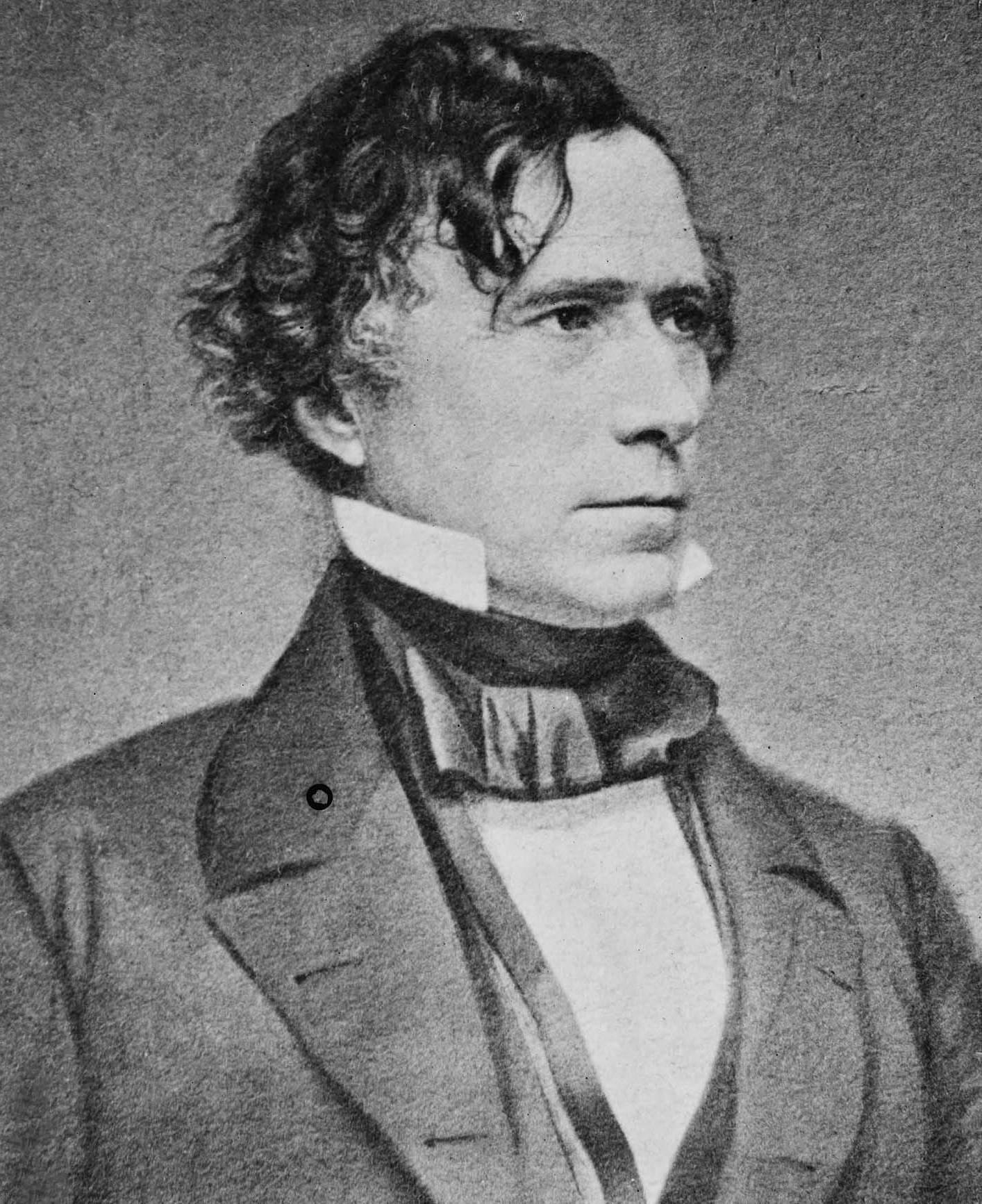
This legislation was vetoed by President Franklin Pierce.

The bill was the signature initiative of activist Dorothea Dix, who initially proposed allocating five million acres (20,000 km^{2}). Between that request on June 23, 1848, and April 1854, Congress doubled the land grant. The main provision of the bill was to set aside 12,225,000 acres (49,473 km^{2}) of federal land: 10,000,000 acres (40,469 km^{2}) would be given for the benefit of the approximately 30,000 Americans suffering from mental disorders. The remaining land would be sold for the benefit of the "blind, deaf, and dumb" with proceeds distributed to state governments to build and maintain asylums.

== Veto ==
The bill was vetoed on May 3, 1854, by President Franklin Pierce, the first of his nine vetoes. Echoing arguments made by then-Senator Jefferson Davis in February 1851, Pierce argued that an interpretation of the Taxing and Spending Clause allowing federal welfare spending would infringe on the states' police powers. Pierce conceded that in March 1819 and April 1826, Congress had made similar land grants to the Connecticut and Kentucky state governments, respectively, for asylums to educate physically disabled individuals. However, Pierce argued that this bill would be widening federal welfare spending to an unjustifiably national scope.

In response, Senator John M. Clayton argued that presidential vetoes should be limited to rejecting unconstitutional legislation and that Congress' "power of the purse" was sufficiently broad to support this spending. Clayton noted that Pierce had voted for the Deposit Act of 1836 while in Congress, allowing the US Department of the Treasury to distribute its surplus funds to state governments. Congress' authority to spend on goals beyond its enumerated powers was further supported by Thomas Jefferson's past advocacy for federal spending on infrastructure.

Senator Solomon Foot similarly argued that prior federal spending on disaster response showed that Congress had broad spending authority as long as states remained capable of further police power legislation. However, on July 6, 1854, only 21 of the necessary 32 senators voted to override Pierce's veto, dooming the legislation.

== Legacy ==
Republicans subsequently passed the Morrill Land-Grant Acts of 1862 and 1890 to provide state governments with land that could be sold to fund the creation of colleges and universities. However, Pierce's veto established a general precedent against federal welfare spending, which lasted over 90 years until challenged by 1930s New Deal programs. During the intervening period, impoverished individuals suffering from mental health conditions were largely forced to rely on state poorhouses and private charity. Libertarian economist Lawrence Reed has praised Pierce's veto as necessary to prevent pork barrel spending.

In the Supreme Court's 1937 decision in Steward Machine Co. v. Davis, Justice James Clark McReynolds' dissent primarily relied on Pierce's veto message to argue against upholding the 1935 Social Security Act for imposing federal payroll taxes to fund unemployment insurance.

In 1946, National Mental Health Act established a federal role in mental health treatment with the National Institute of Mental Health, operating within the US Department of Health and Human Services.
