= Shelli Avenevoli =

American epidemiologist

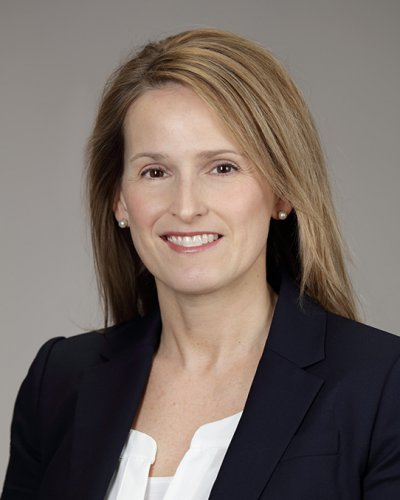
- Education: Temple University
- Scientific career
- Fields: Epidemiology
- Workplaces: National Institute of Mental Health
- Thesis: The continuity of depression from childhood to adolescence (1998)
- Doctoral advisor: Laurence Steinberg

Shelli Avenevoli is an American psychologist and epidemiologist. She was the acting director of the National Institute of Mental Health from June 2024 to April 2025. She is a co-investigator on the National Comorbidity Study.

== Education ==
Avenevoli received her Ph.D. in developmental psychology from Temple University. Her 1998 dissertation was titled The continuity of depression from childhood to adolescence. Avenevoli's doctoral advisor was Laurence Steinberg.

Avenevoli completed an National Institute of Mental Health (NIMH)-funded postdoctoral fellowship in psychiatric epidemiology at Yale School of Medicine.

== Career ==
In 2001, Avenevoli joined the NIMH intramural research program as a staff scientist in the Section of Developmental Genetic Epidemiology of the Mood and Anxiety Disorders Program. In 2005, she moved to the NIMH division of extramural research as chief of the Emotion, Mood, and Depressive Disorders Program. In 2008, Avenevoli became chief of the Developmental Trajectories of Mental Disorders Branch. In this role, she developed NIMH’s translational neurodevelopmental research portfolio and a research program on bipolar disorder and early, chronic irritability in children. Avenevoli is involved in NIMH efforts, including revising the strategic plan, re-defining the Institute’s approach to supporting research in neurodevelopment and bipolar disorder, and serving as a liaison to other agencies for special initiatives. Avenevoli is acting director of NIMH. She is a co-investigator on the National Comorbidity Study.
