= Herb Pardes =

American psychiatrist (1934–2024)

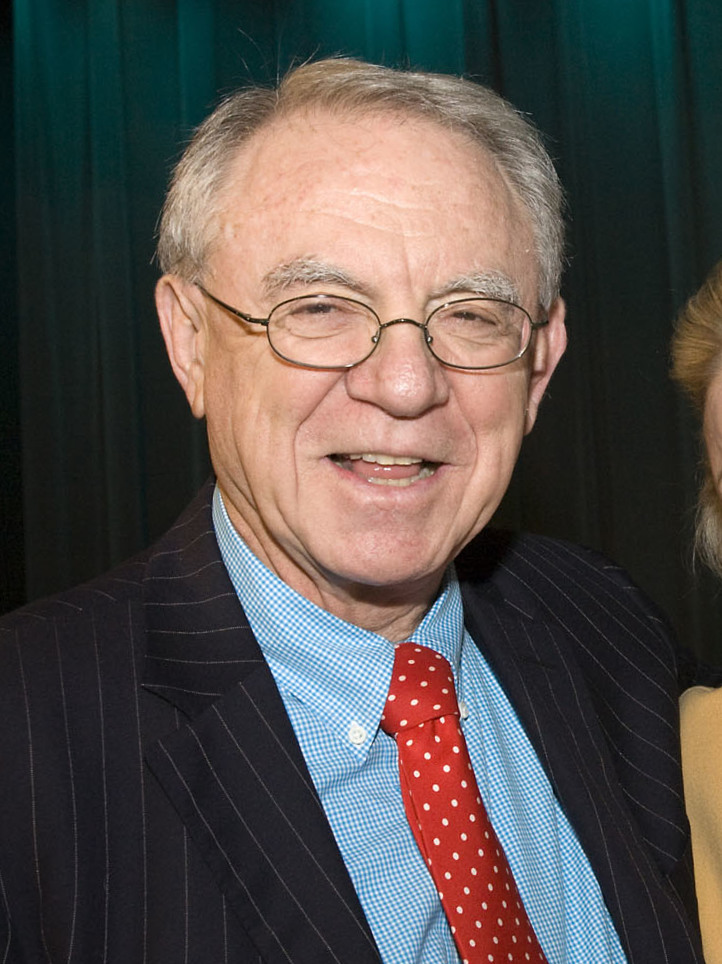

Director of the National Institute of Mental Health
- In office 1977–1984
- Preceded by: Bertram S. Brown
- Succeeded by: Shervert H. Frazier

Personal details
- Born: July 7, 1934 New York City, U.S.
- Died: April 30, 2024 (aged 89) New York City, U.S.
- Children: 3
- Education: Rutgers University; State University of New York-Downstate Medical Center in Brooklyn

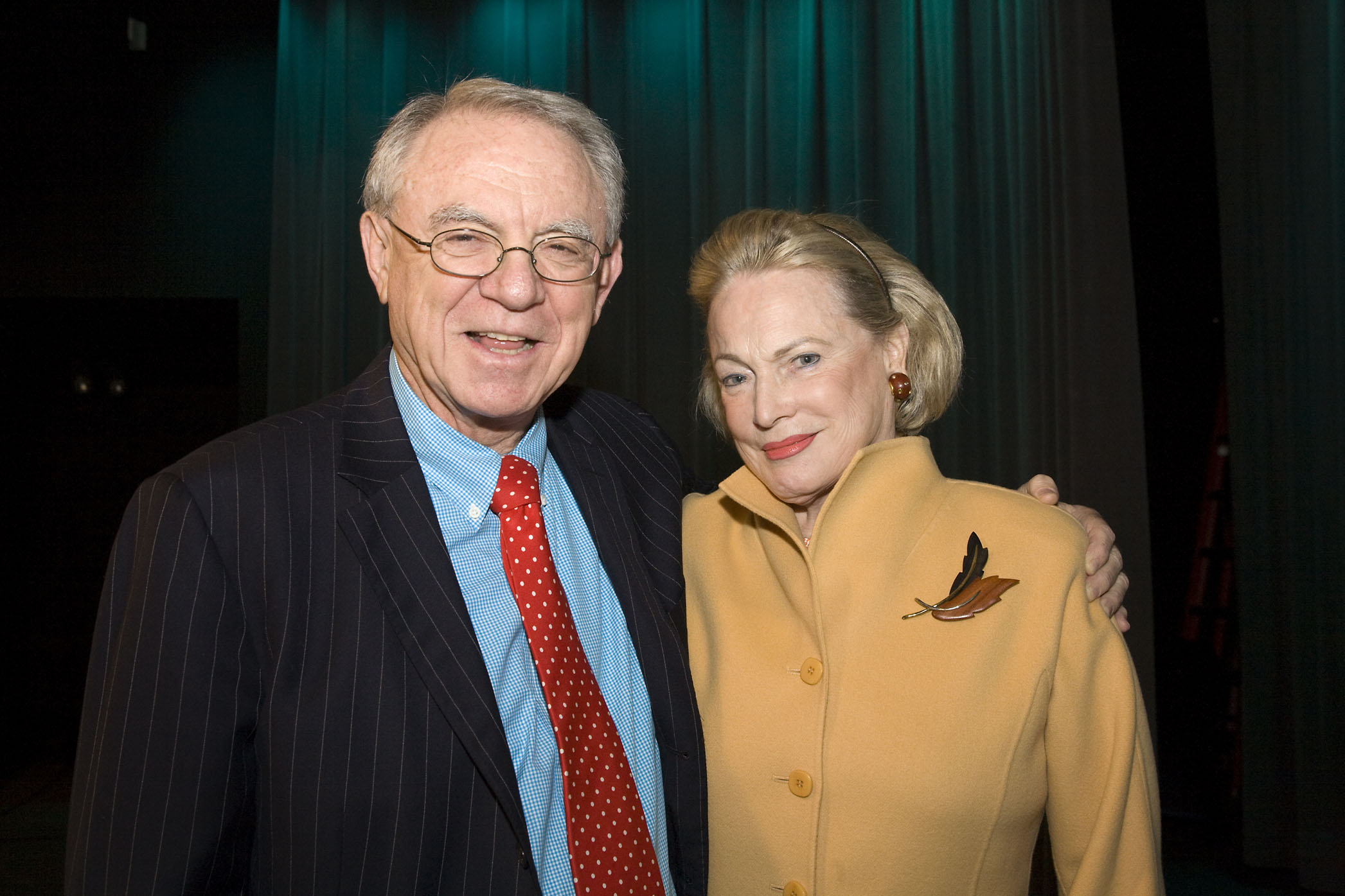
Pardes (left) with Charlotte Ford at a Women's Health Symposium in 2008

Herbert Pardes (July 7, 1934 – April 30, 2024) was an American physician, psychiatrist, and the executive vice-chairman of NewYork-Presbyterian Hospital.

Pardes was the Dean of the Columbia University College of Physicians and Surgeons when he was selected to be the inaugural CEO of the merged Presbyterian Hospital and New York Hospital. Dr Pardes retired in 2011 as CEO of the combined entity, NewYork-Presbyterian Hospital and assumed his current post. He is a national figure in psychiatry and academic medicine.

== Education and career ==
Born in the Bronx, New York, Pardes received his Bachelor of Science degree summa cum laude from Rutgers University in 1956 and his medical degree from the State University of New York-Downstate Medical Center in Brooklyn in 1960.

From 1978 to 1984, he was the director of the National Institute of Mental Health (NIMH), where he strengthened the institute's research program and emphasized the need to increase research support for psychiatry. Pardes was U.S. Assistant Surgeon General under Presidents Jimmy Carter and Ronald Reagan and was appointed to serve on health policy commissions by Presidents Bill Clinton and George W. Bush.

From 1989 he was president of American Psychiatric Association (APA).

Pardes was chair of Columbia's Department of Psychiatry, where he remained a professor. From 1989 to 1998, Pardes was Dean of the Columbia University College of Physicians and Surgeons.

From January 2000 through September 2011, Pardes was president and chief executive officer of NewYork-Presbyterian Hospital and the NewYork-Presbyterian Healthcare System.

Pardes was also a member of Institute of Medicine, president of scientific board of the National Alliance for Research on Schizophrenia and Depression (NARSAD), a charter associate member of the National Depressive and Manic Depressive Association (NDMDA), and a regular advisor to National Alliance on Mental Illness (NAMI), the Anxiety and Depression Association of America, and Mental Health America Association.

Pardes was a member of the board of directors, audit and compensation committees of Value Line Incorporated (NASDAQ:VALU). Pardes was removed "without cause" from all Value Line committees and the board of directors April 16, 2010.

In 2008, the New York State Office of Mental Health renamed the main building of its New York State Psychiatric Institute, the Herbert Pardes Building. In 2008 Pardes received compensation of more than nine million dollars, along with other benefits.

On November 13, 2009, John J. Mack, chairman of the board of trustees, NewYork-Presbyterian Hospital, informed staff "that Dr. Herb Pardes has decided to retire at the end of 2011 as our President and Chief Executive Officer ... While Dr. Pardes is stepping down as CEO at the end of 2011, the intention is that he will continue to play a vital role at the hospital beyond that time."

In 2014, the Brain & Behavior Research Foundation announced a new Pardes Humanitarian Prize in Mental Health would be named in honor of Pardes for his profound impact on the lives of people suffering with mental illness. The award is bestowed annually.

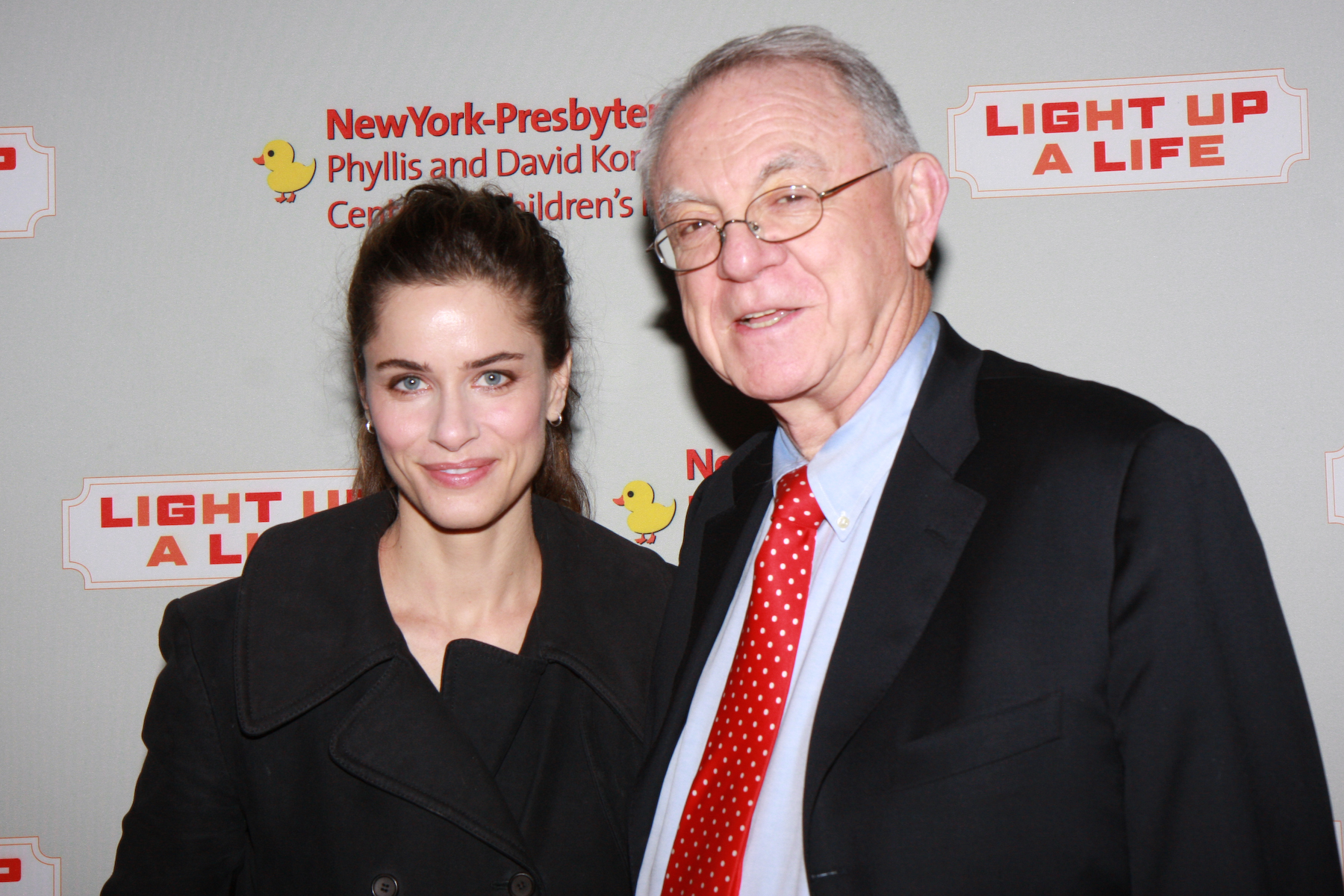
Amanda Peet and Herbert Pardes in 2009

== Personal life and death ==
Pardes lived near the main Columbia University campus in the Morningside Heights neighborhood of Manhattan. He is survived by three sons, Stephen, Lawrence, and James, six grandchildren and his partner, Dr. Nancy Wexler, a professor of neuropsychology at the College of Physicians and Surgeons who was the lead researcher for a study of an extended family’s Huntington’s disease in Venezuela for two decades. She herself has the disease.

Pardes died from aortic stenosis at his home in Manhattan, on April 30, 2024, at the age of 89.

== Bibliography ==
- A Look at Psychiatric Education, Herbert Pardes, M.D. Academic Psychiatry, 30:2,(98-99) March–April 2006
- NIMH during the tenure of Director Herbert Pardes, M.D. (1978–1984): The President's Commission on Mental Health and the reemergence of NIMH's scientific mission.
- Genetics and Psychiatry: Past Discoveries, Current Dilemmas, and Future Directions. Pardes, Herbert; Kaufmann, Charles A; Pincus, Harold Alan; West, Anne
