= Laurence Steinberg =

American professor of psychology (born 1952)

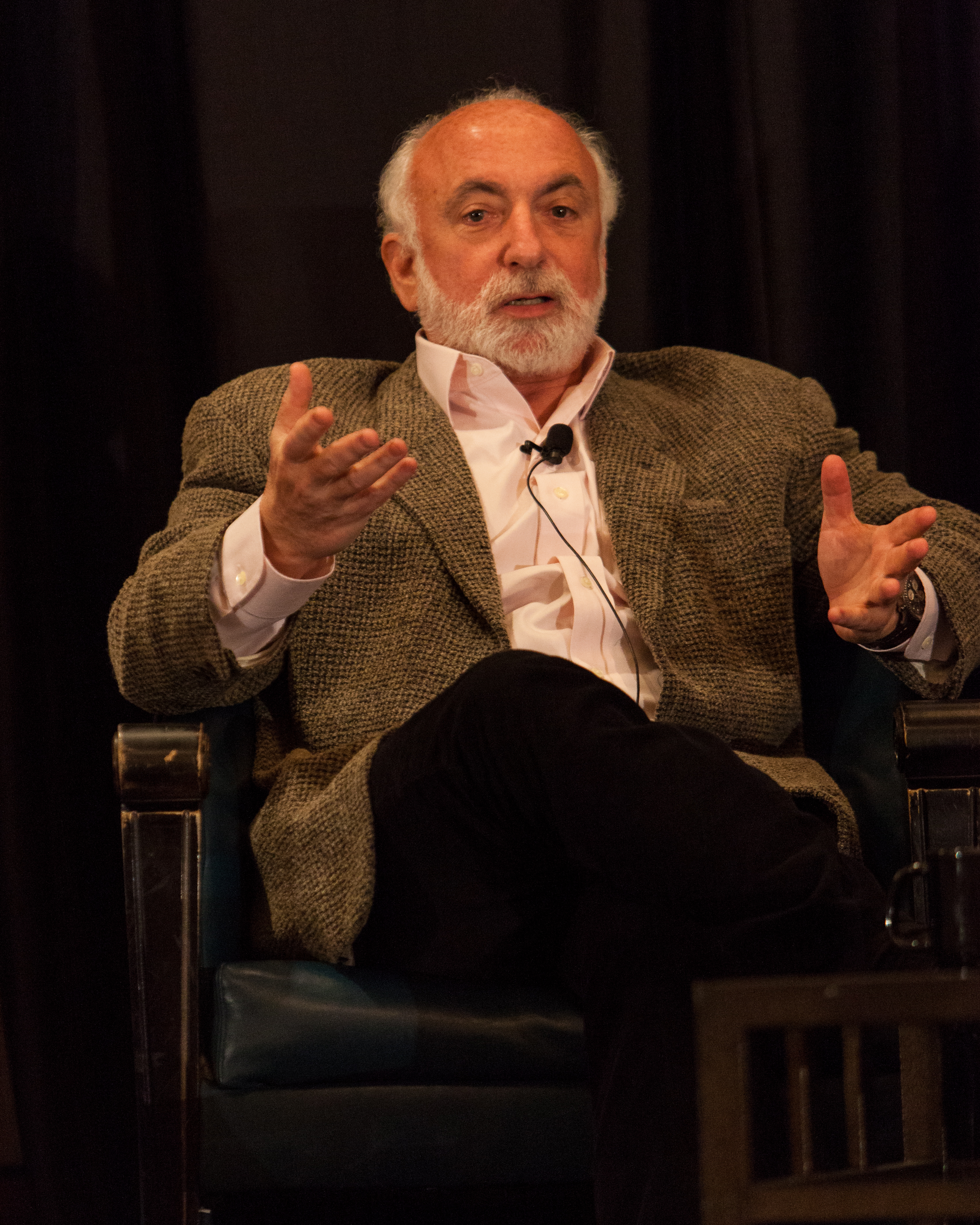
- Laurence Steinberg
- Born: 1952 (age 73–74)
- Education: Vassar College
- Scientific career
- Fields: Developmental psychology
- Workplaces: Temple University
- Doctoral students: Shelli Avenevoli

Laurence Steinberg (born 1952) is an American professor of psychology, specializing in adolescent psychological development.

== Career ==
Steinberg attended Johns Hopkins University from 1970 to 1971, then was educated at Vassar College, where he graduated in 1974 with honors. In 1977 he received his Ph.D. in developmental psychology from Cornell University. From 1977 to 1983 he was an assistant and associate professor at University of California, Irvine and from 1983 to 1989 he was a professor at University of Wisconsin–Madison. From 1988 he has been associated with Temple University in Philadelphia.

Steinberg is Professor Emeritus of Psychology and Neuroscience at Temple University. He is a Fellow of the American Psychological Association, the Association for Psychological Science, and the American Academy of Arts and Sciences. Additionally, he has been a faculty scholar of the William T. Grant Foundation and was director of the John D. and Catherine T. MacArthur Foundation Research Network on Adolescent Development and Juvenile Justice. Steinberg is a former president of both the Division of Developmental Psychology of the American Psychological Association and of the Society for Research on Adolescence.

His research has focused on a range of topics in the study of contemporary adolescence including adolescent brain development, risk-taking and decision-making, parent-adolescent relationships, adolescent employment, high school reform, and juvenile justice. Steinberg proposed the Dual Systems Model of adolescent brain development. He has also been a frequent consultant to state and federal agencies and lawmakers on child labor, secondary education, and juvenile justice policy, as well as an expert witness in criminal trials of juveniles and young adults accused of serious violent crimes. He was the lead scientist on an amicus brief submitted by the American Psychological Association in Roper v. Simmons, the 2005 United States Supreme Court case that abolished the juvenile death penalty. The brief was featured prominently in the Court’s majority opinion, written by Justice Anthony Kennedy.

== Views ==
In a New York Times comment about lowering the legal drinking age, Steinberg responded that it should be lowered from 21 to 19, but not to 18 as is more commonly debated, because it would help deal with illegal drinking on college campuses. He believes that the age of maturity should ultimately remain 18, as any higher would result in too many adults being classified as children, and a lower number may result in too many immature individuals being classified as adults. Ultimately, he believes the age of maturity is somewhere between 15 and 22, on average.

== Awards and recognition ==
Steinberg has been the recipient of the National Academy of Sciences' Henry and Bryna David Lectureship; the Society for Research on Adolescence's John P. Hill Award for Outstanding Contributions to the Study of Adolescence; the Society for Adolescent Medicine's Gallagher Lectureship; and the Association for Psychological Science's James McKeen Fellow Award. Steinberg has also received several lifetime achievement awards from the American Psychological Association, including the Urie Bronfenbrenner Award for Lifetime Contribution to Developmental Psychology in the Service of Science and Society, the Award for Distinguished Contributions to Research in Public Policy, the Award for Distinguished Contributions to Developmental Psychology (formerly known as the G. Stanley Hall Award). In 2008 he was awarded the American Psychological Association's Presidential Citation. In 2009, he was the first recipient of the Klaus J. Jacobs Research Prize for Productive Youth Development. In 2014, he received the Elizabeth Hurlock Beckman Award, a national prize given to professors who have "inspired former students to make a contribution to society."

== Works ==
=== Books ===
- Adolescence. (1st and 2nd editions) New York: Alfred A. Knopf, (3rd-14th editions) New York: McGraw-Hill, 1985-2026.
- The Ten Basic Principles of Good Parenting. New York: Simon & Schuster, 2004.
- Age of Opportunity: Lessons from the New Science of Adolescence. New York: Eamon Dolan/Houghton Mifflin Harcourt, 2014.
- You and Your Adolescent. (Revised Edition) New York: Simon & Schuster, 2011.
- You and Your Adult Child: How to Grow Together in Challenging Times. New York: Simon & Schuster, 2023.

=== As coauthor ===
- Greenberger, E., & Steinberg, L. (1986). When Teenagers Work: The Psychological and Social Costs of Adolescent Employment. New York: Basic Books.
- Steinberg, L., & Belsky, J. (1991). Infancy, Childhood, and Adolescence: Development in Context. New York: McGraw-Hill.
- Steinberg, L., & Steinberg, W. (1994). Crossing Paths: How Your Child’s Adolescence Triggers Your Own Crisis. New York: Simon & Schuster.
- Steinberg, L., & Meyer, R. (1995). Childhood. New York: McGraw-Hill.
- Steinberg, L. (in collaboration with B. Brown & S. Dornbusch) (1996). Beyond the Classroom: Why School Reform has Failed and What Parents Need to Do. New York: Simon & Schuster.
- Steinberg, L., & Levine, A. (1997). You and Your Adolescent: A Parent’s Guide for Ages 10 to 20. (Revised ed.). New York: HarperPerennial.
- Protecting Youth at Work: Health, Safety, and Development of Working Children and Adolescents in the United States. Washington, D.C.: National Academy Press, 1998. (with members of the Committee on the Health and Safety Implications of Child Labor of the National Academy of Sciences-National Research Council).
- Scott, E., & Steinberg, L. (2008). Rethinking Juvenile Justice. Cambridge, Massachusetts: Harvard University Press.
- Steinberg, L., Vandell, D., & Bornstein, M. (2011). Development: Infancy through Adolescence. Belmont, California: Wadsworth.
- Steinberg, L., Bornstein, M., Vandell, D., & Rook, K. (2011). Lifespan Development. Belmont, California: Wadsworth.
- Steinberg, L. (Chair). (2011). The Science of Adolescent Risk-taking. Washington, D.C.: National Academies Press. (with members of the Committee on the Science of Adolescence of the Institute of Medicine and the National Research Council).

=== As editor ===
- Steinberg, L. (Ed.) (1981). The Life Cycle: Readings in Human Development. New York: Columbia University Press.
- Steinberg, L. (Ed.). (1987). Sex Differences in the Family at Adolescence. Special issue of the Journal of Youth and Adolescence, 16(3).
- McLoyd, V., & Steinberg, L. (Eds.) (1998). Studying Minority Adolescents: Conceptual, Methodological, and Theoretical Issues. Mahwah, New Jersey: Erlbaum.
- Lerner, R., & Steinberg, L. (Eds.) (2004 and 2009). Handbook of Adolescent Psychology (2nd and 3rd eds.). New York: Wiley.
- Steinberg, L. (Ed.) (2008). The Future of Children: Juvenile Justice, 18(2).

=== Articles ===
- Steinberg, who is the author of approximately 500 scientific papers, is one of the most frequently cited developmental psychologists in the world and considered by many to be the leading expert on adolescent development. A full list of his published papers may be accessed on his vitae via his website, www.laurencesteinberg.com

== See also ==
- Adolescent crystallization
