= Joshua A. Gordon =

American neuroscientist

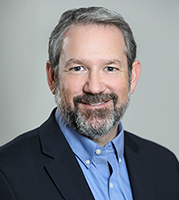
- Born: July 27, 1967 (age 59); New York City, U.S.
- Education: University of California; Washington University in St. Louis
- Known for: Research on the neurobiology of working memory and schizophrenia
- Scientific career
- Workplaces: National Institute of Mental Health; Columbia University

Joshua A. Gordon is an American neuroscientist and psychiatrist who served as the Director of the National Institute of Mental Health (NIMH) from 2016 to June 2024. He is currently the Chair of the Department of Psychiatry at Columbia University Medical Center (CUMC) and the Director of the New York State Psychiatric Institute (NYSPI).

== Early life and education ==
Gordon was born in 1967 in New York City. He earned his bachelor's degree in biology from Washington University in St. Louis in 1989. He then pursued combined MD and PhD degrees at the University of California, San Francisco (UCSF), graduating in 1997.

== Career ==
Gordon obtained a doctorate in neuroscience from UCSF in 1995 and an MD degree in 1997. During his PhD he characterized the developmental processing underlying the emergence of vision in mice. He later served as a faculty member in the Department of Psychiatry at Columbia University where his research focused on the neurobiology of mental illnesses.

In 2016, Gordon was appointed as Director of NIMH to replace Thomas Insel. He was elected to the National Academy of Medicine in 2018.

In 2024, Gordon returned to Columbia University to become the Chair of the Department of Psychiatry and the Director of the New York State Psychiatric Institute.

== Research and contributions ==
Gordon's studies have helped in understanding the neurobiological factors contributing to anxiety, depression and schizophrenia. He has utilized various techniques such as optogenetics and modeling to examine the neural pathways involved in these disorders. He has campaigned for more financial resources for mental health investigations and has been an activist against the social isolation of people with mental health problems. In 2025, he criticized attempts by the Trump administration to remove data on gender identity from the NIMH Data Archive.
