= Bertram S. Brown =

American psychiatrist (1931–2020)

Director of the National Institute of Mental Health
- In office 1970–1977
- Preceded by: Stanley F. Yolles
- Succeeded by: Herb Pardes

Personal details
- Born: January 28, 1931 Brooklyn, New York, U.S.
- Died: May 14, 2020 (aged 89) Bala Cynwyd, Pennsylvania, U.S.
- Education: Brooklyn College; Cornell University medical school Harvard University

Bertram S. Brown (January 28, 1931 – May 14, 2020) was an American psychiatrist who was the head of the National Institute of Mental Health from 1970 to 1977, Assistant Surgeon General from 1978 to 1980, rear admiral in the United States Public Health Service Commissioned Corps, and president and chief executive of Hahnemann University Hospital in Philadelphia from 1983 until his retirement in 1987. He pioneered research in psychiatry, especially in mental disabilities.

== Early life ==
Brown was born in Brooklyn on January 28, 1931. His middle initial “S” did not stand for a full middle name. Brown's parents were Jewish immigrants from Eastern Europe, and his father worked in fur processing. He initially attended The Juilliard School of Music in Manhattan, and although he continued playing the piano throughout his life, he ultimately decided on a career in medicine. Brown graduated from Brooklyn College in 1952, and Cornell University medical school in 1956. He completed a psychiatric residency at Harvard University from 1957 to 1960 and received a master's in public health.

== Career ==
In 1960, Brown became a commissioned officer in the U.S. Public Health Service, eventually attaining the rank of rear admiral and assistant surgeon general. In 1961, he was appointed by John F. Kennedy on a panel of experts to examine mental disability in criminals. He then became the Special Assistant to the President regarding intellectual disability, additionally serving as head of the Community Mental Health Facilities branch of the NIMH during the mid-1960s where he oversaw federal government support of deinstitutionalization. In that role, he led the replacement of large state-run psychiatric hospitals with locally based "community centers" and Brown continued to make that a priority when he became Director of the NIMH in 1970. He believed that long-term stays in psychiatric hospitals should be replaced with care within the community. Brown was also an early advocate of the decriminalization of marijuana, saying that the penalties were "much too severe and much out of keeping with knowledge about its harmfulness." After a political reshuffle, in which HEW Secretary Joseph A. Califano Jr. stated the need for "fresh blood", he moved to become President of Hahnemann Hospital, and then Senior Psychiatrist at the RAND CORP.

According to the Washington Post obituary, "In Washington, Dr. Brown became an authority on political psychiatry, focusing on individual leadership qualities, group dynamics, political strategy and tactics to achieve policy goals, especially when it came to the occupier of the White House."

In the 2009 book In the President's Secret Service by Ronald Kessler, Brown was quoted:

"The White House is a character crucible. Many of those who run crave superficial celebrity. They are hollow people who have no principles and simply want to be elected. Even if an individual is balanced, once someone becomes president, how does one solve the conundrum of staying real and somewhat humble when one is surrounded by the most powerful office in the land, and from becoming overwhelmed by an at times pathological environment that treats you every day as an emperor? Here is where the true strength of the character of the person, not his past accomplishments, will determine whether his presidency ends in accomplishment or failure."

== Death ==
On May 14, 2020, Brown died at the age of 89 from cardiovascular disease in Bala Cynwyd, Pennsylvania.
