= Robert H. Felix =

American neuroscientist (1904–1990)

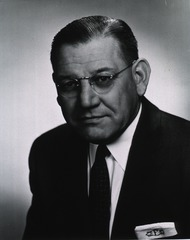
- Born: May 29, 1904; Cincinnati, Ohio, US
- Died: March 31, 1990 (aged 85); Sun City, Arizona, US
- Education: University of Cincinnati (B.A.); University of Cincinnati College of Medicine (M.D.)
- Known for: Research on oxytocin and vasopressin
- Scientific career
- Workplaces: University of Cincinnati; Medical Center for Federal Prisoners; Federal Medical Center, Lexington; U.S. Coast Guard Academy; Bureau of Medical Services; National Institute of Mental Health; George Washington University; Georgetown University; Saint Louis University

Robert Hanna Felix (May 29, 1904 – March 31, 1990) was an American psychiatrist and administrator who served as the first director of the National Institute of Mental Health (NIMH) from 1949 to 1964 and a former president of the American Psychiatric Association.

== Background ==
=== Early life and education ===
Felix was born in 1904 in Cincinnati, Ohio, and spent the next two decades of his life between Washington, D.C., from 1944 to 1964. His undergraduate degree and medical degrees came from Colorado University where he completed both. He went on to study for a master's degree in public health at Johns Hopkins University. He did his psychiatric residency studies at the Colorado Psychopathic Hospital which positioned him as one of the best-known psychiatrists globally with expertise applied across various fields within his profession. He earned his bachelor's degree from the University of Cincinnati in 1925 as well as his medical degree from the University of Cincinnati College of Medicine in 1929.

=== Career ===
Felix worked in a variety of mental health settings after finishing his internship and residency in psychiatry at the University of Cincinnati. He began his career in the Public Health Service in 1933 as an assistant surgeon at the Medical Center for Federal Prisoners in Springfield, Missouri. In 1936, he moved to the Federal Narcotics Farm in Lexington, Kentucky, as a staff psychiatrist. During World War II, he served at the U.S. Coast Guard Academy in New London, Connecticut, first as staff psychiatrist and then as senior medical officer. In 1944, he was promoted to assistant chief of the hospital division of the Bureau of Medical Services, and just a few months later, in November 1944, he became chief of the mental hygiene division, marking a significant milestone in his career.

As a leader in the Public Health Service, he championed the Mental Health Act of 1946, which led to the creation of the National Institute of Mental Health (NIMH). He was appointed the first director of NIMH in 1949, and worked to change the way people with mental illnesses were treated. He served in the capacity for 15 years and during that time he became known as a compassionate leader who was claimed to be selfless and dedicated, that earned him recognition from public. During his tenure as director of NIMH, he aimed on developing the country's mental health strategies with an emphasis on research, treatment, and prevention. He funded notable expansions into the institute's budget and staff while initiating psychiatric education programs as well as investigations training programs and community mental health services. At his retirement in 1964, he had become a model career civil servant and left behind a legacy on mental health policies and research.

Felix held a series of positions, such as the president of the American Psychiatric Association between 1960 and 1961 and also served as the president of the Southern Psychiatric Association during 1946 to 1947. He was also in the Advisory Panel for Mental Health for World Health Organization from 1952 to 1978.

Felix was an authority in drug addiction and alcoholism domains. Several journals, such as the Psychiatric Bulletin and the Quarterly Journal of Studies of Alcohol, have enlisted his expertise for editing duties, among other contributions. Apart from being a technical writer, he went to reach out to all manner of people via articles he published in mainstream media. One of these was "How to Live with Job Pressure", printed in Nation's Business back in 1956, which showed how he painted current's issues before readers through refreshing ideas. His writing contained various disciplines within psychiatry distilled into simple terms so that many people may understand them. He simplified complex psychiatric ideas through his articles.

Felix was also a dedicated educator and mental health professional. He worked in Washington teaching mental hygiene class at George Washington University; besides he used to hold the position of professor of clinical psychiatry at Georgetown University School of Medicine. After leaving Washington in 1964, he spent a decade as a professor and medical school dean at Saint Louis University. Following his tenure at Saint Louis University, he directed a bi-state mental health program before retiring in 1986 and relocating to Arizona.

== Contributions and legacy ==
Felix's management style at NIMH revolutionized psychiatry and mental health. He set up NIMH as a precursor in mental health studies and regulations, encouraging teamwork among experimenters, health workers, and legislators. He also promoted the disbanding of asylums as well as therapy delivered in neighborhoods including donation of money for studies uncovering cellular origins behind madness.

== Awards and recognition ==
Felix received several awards and honors for his contributions to psychiatry such as Distinguish service award from Public Health Service organization and American Psychiatric Association. In1963, he got Edward A. Strecker Medal for Psychiatry while in 1961 he received Rockefeller Public Service Award. The accolades demonstrated Felix's dedication, expertise, and leadership in the field of psychiatry, and his lasting impact on the mental health community. He also received the Thomas William Salmon Medal.

== Death ==
After his retirement from NIMH in 1964, Felix went on to work in psychiatry and mental health as a consultant and advisor to various organizations. He died in 1990, leaving behind a legacy as an original character in American psychiatry and mental health policy. He died at his home in Sun City, Arizona, due asthma.

== Personal life ==
Felix was married and is survived by wife aged 56 at the time he died, Esther R. Wagner Felix, and their daughter, Katherine Felix Hoenigman, as well as two grandchildren.
