= Adolescent crystallization =

Adolescent crystallisation refers to a phase of vocational development in which individuals form increasingly stable occupational preferences. The term was introduced by American psychologist Donald Super as part of his broader theory of vocational development, in which career choice is presented as a continuous process of developing a self-concept across life stages. Within Super's exploratory stage, crystallisation describes the point at which tentative preferences give way to more structured and considered occupational goals, typically occurring in mid-to-late adolescence. As vocational development is rooted in self-concept formation, adolescent crystallisation is closely linked to broader processes of identity development and can be explained using wider theories on identity formation with age.

== Theories ==
Psychologist Erik Erikson developed a theory of psychosocial development, positing that human personality develops in a series of eight sequential stages from infancy to adulthood. The fifth stage, “Identity vs Role Confusion”, establishes identity formation as the core task of adolescence. During this stage, individuals shift from identifying purely with parental values toward evaluating their own beliefs in relation to peers and other role models. Erikson's theory posits that an unresolved adolescent identity complicates later development, seeing as self-knowledge is deemed necessary for adult commitments in romance, vocation, and general functioning.

Important neurobiological processes during adolescence include myelination and synaptic pruning. These target the prefrontal cortex, a brain region vital for executive functions like planning, decision-making, weighing risk, and impulse control. Continued maturation of this area supports the capacity for self-reflection and long-term planning that career crystallisation requires.

Social environments heavily influence an adolescent's identity and choice in occupation. Research by Edgar Krau concludes that subcultures of an adolescent's social group determine work value crystallisation, with school and working environments as primary agents of transmission.

== Studies ==
Empirical research has sought to examine how these sociocultural factors shape crystallisation in practice. A longitudinal study using a sample of 1,000 ninth-graders conducted by the University of Minnesota investigated whether working during high school helped form adolescents' choices in crystallisation of occupation. The results of the study showed “aging stability”, meaning work value choices crystallized as participants aged through the four-year high school period. Researchers concluded it was not employment itself or number of hours worked that affected occupational value formation. Skill and responsibility building roles proved to be more effective in crystallising intrinsic and extrinsic work values compared to repetitive, low-autonomy jobs. The specific conditions of social environments matter in vocational crystallisation, not merely being exposed to them.

Another longitudinal study done by Arizona State University assessed career interests and crystallisation on a national sample of 1000 males and 1000 females, tracked from eighth to twelfth grade. The study examined the degree to which interest profiles became more differentiated and clearly defined over time. Both males and females showed stability in their interest profiles across the period, and crystallisation increased with age, which is consistent with developmental models predicting higher differentiation as adolescence progresses. However, alignment between interests and career choices improved from grade eight to ten and then dipped in twelfth grade. The authors attribute this decline to pressures associated with college applications and imminent career choices, which they suggest may prompt reassessment of previously forming interests. Late adolescence involves active reassessment of identity rather than straight consolidation.

== Real world effects ==
Sociocultural environments through which broader identity crystallisation occurs have shifted in the digital age. Alongside school and work, social media platforms constitute a primary platform through which adolescents access role models and explore identity. A systematic review of 32 studies with over 19,000 adolescents found that, in line with the Minnesota study, active participation on social media, rather than time spent on it, influences identity development. However, research indicates that social media introduces pressures that may complicate the crystallisation process. Algorithmically reinforced content can lead adolescents to commit to identities and vocations that are externally rewarded but internally incongruent with developing intrinsic values. Studies suggest this may contribute to identity fragmentation instead of crystallisation, as adolescents pursue external validation rather than authentic self-exploration.

Such algorithmically mediated pressures on adolescent identity formation, alongside other products of globalisation and the rapid proliferation of artificial intelligence, contribute to a broader rise in vocational uncertainty in youths. A 2025 OECD analysis of data found that 39% of 15 year olds are career uncertain, marking a substantial increase since 2018. Vocational plans hold predictive merit; uncertain adolescents are more likely to experience poorer employment outcomes in the future. The OECD recommends that schools increase access to interactive career development activities, noting that participation is positively associated with better long-term employment outcomes.

== Criticisms ==
Adolescence is marked both by physiological changes brought upon by puberty and heavily defined through culture. Foundational research on identity crystallisation reflects the WEIRD problem in psychology. Samples drawn from western, industrialised, rich, democratic populations have limited generalisability to global demographics as their external validity is implicitly assumed. What constitutes adolescence differs considerably across cultures and historical periods, and Erikson's theory has faced criticism for its western-centricism, assumption of linear development, difficulty to quantitatively analyse, and underrepresentation of women.
