= Life-span, life-space theory =

Model in vocational psychology

The Life-span, life-space theory is a prominent model in vocational psychology developed by American psychologist Donald Super. It emphasizes that career development is a lifelong process, shaped by an individual’s evolving self-concept and the various social roles they occupy across their lifespan. The theory integrates developmental psychology with a focus on life roles and career maturity, forming the foundation for many career counseling practices worldwide.

== Theoretical foundations ==
Super proposed that career choices are not isolated decisions but reflect a person’s broader attempt to implement their self-concept. Self-concept, in this context, is how individuals perceive their abilities, values, personality, and preferences. As people grow and experience new environments, their self-concept evolves, and so too may their career trajectory.

== Developmental stages ==
Super outlined five major life stages in career development, each representing a set of tasks and transitions individuals typically encounter. These stages are age-related but flexible depending on individual circumstances and life changes.

The Growth stage (birth to age 14) focuses on the formation of attitudes, interests, and initial self-concepts. Children begin to understand the world of work through role models and experiences, laying the groundwork for future career development.

The Exploration stage (ages 15–24) is characterized by the tentative examination of career options. Through part-time work, education, and hobbies, individuals begin to crystallize and specify vocational preferences and initiate preliminary occupational choices.

The Establishment stage (ages 25–44) involves entry into the workforce and efforts to achieve stability and advancement. Individuals solidify their career identity through skill development, work experience, and upward mobility.

During the Maintenance stage (ages 45–64), individuals work to preserve their positions, refine their expertise, and adjust to changing job demands. This period may include mentoring or reevaluating long-term goals.

The Disengagement stage (age 65 and older) centers on preparing for and transitioning into retirement. People gradually reduce their workload and begin to withdraw from active participation in their professional roles.

== Life roles and the life-career rainbow ==
A distinctive element of the theory is its recognition of multiple life roles. Super introduced the concept of the life-career rainbow to illustrate how individuals concurrently manage roles such as child, student, worker, spouse, and citizen. These roles shift in importance over time and interact with one’s career path. Some scholars have argued that Super’s stage-based structure may not account for individuals whose career paths are nonlinear or interrupted, such as those affected by economic instability, caregiving responsibilities, or health challenges.

== Career maturity ==
Super also introduced the construct of career maturity, which refers to an individual’s readiness to make appropriate career decisions at different developmental stages. Career maturity involves cognitive, emotional, and behavioral readiness and varies across individuals independent of chronological age.

== Criticism and limitations ==
Although the Life-Span, Life-Space Theory has been influential, it has received some critique. Scholars have noted that the model was developed primarily within a Western cultural context and may not fully capture the experiences of individuals in collectivist cultures or in contexts where career paths are constrained by socioeconomic or systemic factors. Others have questioned the model’s applicability to nonlinear or flexible career paths, especially in light of changing labor market dynamics and the rise of gig and freelance work. Super’s theory is one of the most widely referenced frameworks in career counseling literature, offering a comprehensive model that addresses personal development across the life span. Some scholars have argued that Super’s stage-based structure may not account for individuals whose career paths are nonlinear or interrupted, such as those affected by economic instability, caregiving responsibilities, or health challenges.

== Legacy and influence ==
Super’s work laid the foundation for modern developmental approaches to career counseling. The model continues to inform academic research, career assessment tools, and practical frameworks in education and human resource development. His emphasis on self-concept and life roles helped shift vocational psychology toward a more holistic and lifespan-oriented view of career development. Career construction theory, developed by Mark Savickas, builds upon Super’s emphasis on self-concept by incorporating narrative approaches to career development.

== See also ==
- Holland Codes
- Circumscription and compromise theory
