= National Comorbidity Survey =

First large-scale field survey of mental health in the United States

The National Comorbidity Survey: Baseline (NCS-1) was the first large-scale field survey of mental health in the United States. Conducted from 1990–1992, disorders were assessed based on the diagnostic criteria of the then-most current DSM manual, the DSM-III-R (Diagnostic and Statistical Manual of Mental Disorders, Third Edition, Revised). The study has had large-scale implications on mental health research in the United States, as no widespread data on the prevalence of mental illness was previously available.

== Survey Waves ==
Baseline survey (NCS-1, 1990–1992). A supplemental sample of students residing in campus group housing was included in NCS-1, a household survey of people aged 15–54 in the non-institutionalised civilian population of the 48 contiguous United States conducted between 1990 and 1992. In line with the design of large epidemiological surveys that balance respondent burden with measurement breadth, ICPSR estimates an 82.6% response rate and a multi-part structure. Clinician reappraisal interviews in disorder-specific subsamples, based on the lifetime SCID for DSM-III-R, are noted in Harvard's baseline instrument notes, which characterise the baseline schedule as a fully structured face-to-face interview conducted with paper-and-pencil.

Re-interview follow-up (NCS-2, 2001–2002). 5,001 baseline individuals were reinterviewed by NCS-2 in 2001–2002 to measure changes in mental disorders and drug use disorders, as well as examine determinants and effects of change across the ten years between waves. As an example of how longitudinal follow-up designs can target change and continuity while minimising redundant questioning, the ICPSR research record also notes that interview questions were tailored to each respondent based on their baseline responses. The NCS-2 main interview is described as CAPI with a customised "preload" file in Harvard's instruments overview, which also mentions clinical reassessment interviews conducted over the phone using paper-and-pencil techniques.

Replication survey (NCS‑R, 2001–2003). A nationally representative, multi-stage, clustered-area, probability household sample was used to select English-speaking individuals in the coterminous United States who were 18 years of age or older for the in-home, face-to-face NCS-R survey, which took place between February 2001 and April 2003. In addition to reporting 9,282 completed main interviews and 554 brief nonresponse interviews, the design and field procedures document details the weighting and nonresponse-bias evaluation techniques used for prevalence and correlation analysis. Instrument development, interviewer training, and field procedures pertinent to harmonised cross-survey analyses are further documented in a companion methods paper detailing CPES implementation.

Adolescent supplement (NCS-A, 2001–2004). Using a dual-frame design that combined a household sample selected from NCS-R families with a representative school sample from the same neighbourhoods, NCS-A extended similar measures to teenagers aged 13–17. Response rates of 74.7% in the household sample and 85.9% in the school sample are reported in ICPSR paperwork, which also characterises the study as restricted-use for secrecy. The University of Michigan Survey Research Centre conducted the primary data collection and fieldwork, according to the peer-reviewed overview publication that details NCS-A fieldwork and design elements.

== Methods and Measurement ==
In addition to clinician-administered reappraisal and calibration investigations in subsamples, structured diagnostic interviews conducted by trained lay interviewers were used to evaluate diagnoses and correlates throughout the NCS family. According to Harvard's instruments overview, NCS-R and NCS-2 reappraisal interviews used SCID versions aligned with DSM-IV, while baseline clinical reappraisal interviews were based on the lifetime SCID for DSM-III-R and conducted over the phone by qualified clinicians following the main baseline interview. The use of parent data collection in conjunction with adolescent interviews, including reconciliation interviews when parent and adolescent reports diverged, and clinical reappraisal based on K-SADS procedures for adolescents are described in Harvard and ICPSR documentation.

A peer-reviewed overview describes the WMH Survey Initiative version of the Composite International Diagnostic Interview (WMH-CIDI) as having a screening module and several sections covering diagnoses, functioning, treatment, sociodemographic correlates, and methodological factors. It can be administered using computer-assisted or paper-and-pencil methods and supports DSM-IV and ICD-10 diagnostic algorithms. A related clinical calibration publication provides modelling techniques for calibration when SCID diagnoses are insufficient and explains the reasoning behind comparing WMH-CIDI diagnoses with clinician-administered SCID diagnoses in subsamples.

== Notable findings ==
- The lifetime prevalence of at least one mental disorder: 57.4%
- 12 month prevalence of at least one mental disorder: 32.4%
- Comorbidity: Of the people who had experienced a mental illness in their lifetime (48% of the population), 27% had experienced more than one. The resulting average is 2.1 mental disorders per disordered person.
- Only 40% of people who had ever had a disorder received professional treatment.
- Only 20% of people who had had a disorder within the past year received professional help.

== Limitations and Interpretation ==
Differences in sample frames, diagnostic systems, and interview styles between waves must be taken into consideration when interpreting NCS estimates. For instance, NCS-R concentrated on English-speaking adults aged 18 and over in the coterminous United States, whereas the baseline survey was restricted to ages 15–54 in the contiguous United States. This has an impact on comparability and generalisability to populations not sampled. Like other population surveys, the program has evolved across DSM versions (baseline emphasis on DSM-III-R; NCS-R emphasis on DSM-IV) and interviewing technologies (PAPI to CAPI). The NCS-R design paper addresses nonresponse-bias assessment and weighting approaches meant to mitigate such issues.

What readers and secondary analysts may confirm is further influenced by data access restrictions. For example, public-use files may not contain comprehensive geographic identifiers, and some waves are restricted-use, which may limit replication using only public files. These restrictions should be made clear in a neutral Wikipedia article so that readers are aware of the extent and limitations of published estimations.
