= National Institute of Mental Health =

Government research organization in the US

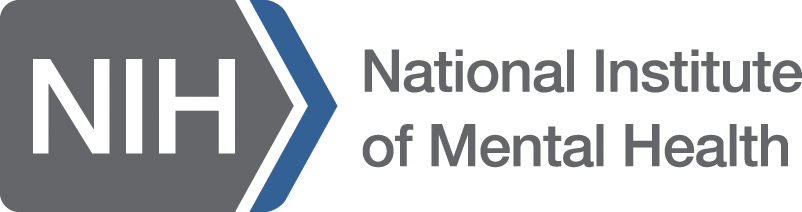

Agency overview
- Formed: April 15, 1949; 77 years ago
- Headquarters: Bethesda, Maryland, U.S.
- Annual budget: $1.63 billion (2020)
- Agency executives: Andrea Beckel-Mitchener, Director (Acting); Susan E. Koester, Deputy Director (Acting)
- Parent agency: National Institutes of Health
- Website: nimh.nih.gov

The National Institute of Mental Health (NIMH) is one of 27 institutes and centers that make up the National Institutes of Health (NIH). The NIH, in turn, is an agency of the United States Department of Health and Human Services and is the primary agency of the United States government responsible for biomedical and health-related research.

NIMH is the largest research organization in the world specializing in mental illness. Andrea Beckel-Mitchener is the current acting director of NIMH. The institute was first authorized by the U.S. government in 1946, when then President Harry Truman signed into law the National Mental Health Act, although the institute was not formally established until 1949.

NIMH is a $1.5 billion enterprise, supporting research on mental health through grants to investigators at institutions and organizations throughout the United States and through its own internal (intramural) research effort. The mission of NIMH is "to transform the understanding and treatment of mental illnesses through basic and clinical research, paving the way for prevention, recovery, and cure."

In order to fulfill this mission, the NIMH states that it "must foster innovative thinking and ensure that a full array of novel scientific perspectives are used to further discovery in the evolving science of brain, behavior, and experience. In this way, breakthroughs in science can become breakthroughs for all people with mental illnesses."

== Research priorities ==
NIMH has identified four overarching strategic objectives for itself:

- Promote discovery in the brain and behavioral sciences to fuel research on the causes of mental disorders
- Chart mental illness trajectories to determine when, where, and how to intervene
- Develop new and better interventions that incorporate the diverse needs and circumstances of people with mental illnesses
- Strengthen the public health impact of NIMH-supported research

== History ==
=== Organizational history ===
NIMH had passed through a series of name changes and organizational arrangements with in the United States Public Health Service (PHS) throughout its history:

- PHS Narcotics Division (1929–30) (Not to be confused with the Bureau of Prohibition Narcotics Division)
- PHS Division of Mental Hygiene (1930–43)
- Mental Hygiene Division, within the PHS Bureau of Medical Services (1943–49)
- National Institute of Mental Health (NIMH), one of the National Institutes of Health (NIH, 1949–67)
- NIMH as an independent division of the PHS (1967–68)
- NIMH, within the Health Services and Mental Health Administration (1968–73)
- NIMH, within NIH (1973)
- NIMH, within the Alcohol, Drug Abuse, and Mental Health Administration (1973–1992)
- NIMH, within NIH (1992–present)

In 1992, when the Alcohol, Drug Abuse, and Mental Health Administration was abolished, NIMH was transferred to NIH, retaining its research functions while its treatment services were transferred to the new Substance Abuse and Mental Health Services Administration.

=== Prohibition era ===
During the Prohibition era, the Narcotics Division of the Bureau of Public Health was responsible for the patients confined to the "narcotic farms" that had been a result of the Narcotic Farms Act of 1929. Confusingly, the Bureau of Prohibition which was also in the Treasury had in its organizational structure a Narcotics Division whose Deputy Commissioner was Levi G. Nutt, an advocate of forced confinement of addicts to the narcotic farms.

=== Functions ===
Mental health has traditionally been a state responsibility, but after World War II there was increased lobbying for a federal (national) initiative. Attempts to create a National Neuropsychiatric Institute failed. Robert H. Felix, then head of the Division of Mental Hygiene, orchestrated a movement to include mental health policy as an integral part of federal biomedical policy. Congressional subcommittees hearings were held and the National Mental Health Act was signed into law in 1946. This aimed to support the research, prevention and treatment of psychiatric illness, and called for the establishment of a National Advisory Mental Health Council (NAMHC) and a National Institute of Mental Health. On April 15, 1949, the NIMH was formally established, with Felix as director. Funding for the NIMH grew slowly and then, from the mid-1950s, dramatically. The institute took on a highly influential role in shaping policy, research and communicating with the public, legitimizing the importance of new advances in biomedical science, psychiatric and psychological services, and community-based mental health policies.

In 1955, the Mental Health Study Act called for "an objective, thorough, nationwide analysis and reevaluation of the human and economic problems of mental health." The resulting Joint Commission on Mental Illness and Health prepared a report, "Action for Mental Health", resulting in the establishment of a cabinet-level interagency committee to examine the recommendations and determine an appropriate federal response.

In 1963, Congress passed the Mental Retardation Facilities and Community Mental Health Centers Construction Act, beginning a new era in Federal support for mental health services. NIMH assumed responsibility for monitoring the Nation's community mental health centers (CMHC) programs.

During the mid-1960s, NIMH launched a campaign on special mental health problems. Part of this was a response to President Lyndon Johnson's pledge to apply scientific research to social problems. The institute established centers for research on schizophrenia, child and family mental health, suicide, as well as crime and delinquency, minority group mental health problems, urban problems, and later, rape, aging, and technical assistance to victims of natural disasters.

Alcohol abuse and alcoholism did not receive full recognition as a major public health problem until the mid-1960s, when the National Center for Prevention and Control of Alcoholism was established as part of NIMH; a research program on drug abuse was inaugurated within NIMH with the establishment of the Center for Studies of Narcotic and Drug Abuse.

In 1967, NIMH separated from NIH and was given bureau status within PHS. However, NIMH's intramural research program, which conducted studies in the NIH Clinical Center and other NIH facilities, remained at NIH under an agreement for joint administration between NIH and NIMH. Secretary of Health, Education, and Welfare John W. Gardner transferred St. Elizabeths Hospital, the Federal Government's only civilian psychiatric hospital, to NIMH.

In 1968, NIMH became a component of PHS's Health Services and Mental Health Administration (HSMHA).

In 1970, the Comprehensive Alcohol Abuse and Alcoholism Prevention, Treatment, and Rehabilitation Act (P.L. 91-616) established the National Institute of Alcohol Abuse and Alcoholism within NIMH.

In 1972, the Drug Abuse Office and Treatment Act established a National Institute on Drug Abuse within NIMH.

In 1973, NIMH went through a series of organizational moves. The institute temporarily rejoined NIH on July 1 with the abolishment of HSMHA. Then, the DHEW secretary administratively established the Alcohol, Drug Abuse, and Mental Health Administration (ADAMHA) – composed of the National Institute on Alcohol Abuse and Alcoholism, the National Institute on Drug Abuse, and NIMH – as the successor organization to HSMHA. ADAMHA was officially established in 1974.

The President's Commission on Mental Health in 1977 reviewed the mental health needs of the nation and to make recommendations to the president as to how best meet these needs in 1978. In August 1977, The Washington Post reported that senior directors at the NIMH were likely aware of the institute's covert participation in the Central Intelligence Agency's MKUltra experiments, administering LSD to federal prisoners in Lexington, Kentucky.

In 1980, The Epidemiologic Catchment Area (ECA) study, an unprecedented research effort that entailed interviews with a nationally representative sample of 20,000 Americans was launched. The field interviews and first wave analyses were completed in 1985. Data from the ECA provided a picture of rates of mental and addictive disorders and services usage.

The Mental Health Systems Act of 1980 – based on recommendations of the President's Commission on Mental Health and designed to provide improved services for persons with mental disorders – was passed. NIMH participated in development of the National Plan for the Chronically Mentally Ill, a sweeping effort to improve services and fine-tune various Federal entitlement programs for those with severe, persistent mental disorders.

In 1987, administrative control of St. Elizabeth's Hospital was transferred from the NIMH to the District of Columbia. NIMH retained research facilities on the grounds of the hospital. The NIMH Neuroscience Center and the NIMH Neuropsychiatric Research Hospital, located on the grounds of St. Elizabeth's Hospital, were dedicated in 1989.

In 1992, Congress passed the ADAMHA Reorganization Act, abolishing ADAMHA. The research components of NIAAA, NIDA and NIMH rejoined NIH, while the services components of each institute became part of a new PHS agency, the Substance Abuse and Mental Health Services Administration (SAMHSA). The return to NIH and the loss of services functions to SAMHSA necessitated a realignment of the NIMH extramural program administrative organization. New offices were created for research on Prevention, Special Populations, Rural Mental Health and AIDS.

In 1994, The House Appropriations Committee mandated that the director of NIH conduct a review of the role, size, and cost of all NIH intramural research programs (IRP). NIMH and the National Advisory Mental Health Council (NAMHC) initiated a major study of the NIMH Intramural Research Program. The planning committee recommended continued investment in the IRP and recommended specific administrative changes; many of these were implemented upon release of the committee's final report; other changes — for example, the establishment of a major new program on Mood and Anxiety Disorders — have been introduced in the years since.

In 1996, NIMH, with the NAMHC, initiated systematic reviews of a number of areas of its research portfolio, including the genetics of mental disorders; epidemiology and services for child and adolescent populations; prevention research; clinical treatment and services research. At the request of the National Institute for Mental Health director, the NAMH Council established programmatic groups in each of these areas. NIMH (National Institute of Mental Health) continued to implement recommendations issued by these Workgroups.

In 1997, NIMH realigned its extramural organizational structure to capitalize on new technologies and approaches to both basic and clinical science, as well as changes that had occurred in health care delivery systems, while retaining the institute's focus on mental illness. The new extramural organization resulted in three research divisions: Basic and Clinical Neuroscience Research; Services and Intervention Research; and Mental Disorders, Behavioral Research and AIDS.

Between 1997 and 1999, NIMH refocused career development resources on early careers and added new mechanisms for clinical research. It also launched mentorship initiatives and expanded funding for early-career researchers, fostering a diverse pipeline of mental health professionals.

In 1999, The NIMH Neuroscience Center/Neuropsychiatric Research Hospital was relocated from St. Elizabeth's Hospital in Washington, D.C., to the NIH Campus in Bethesda, Maryland, in response to the recommendations of the 1996 review of the NIMH (National Institute of Mental Health) Intramural Research Program by the IRP Planning Committee.

The first White House Conference on Mental Health, held June 7, in Washington, D.C., brought together national leaders, mental health scientific and clinical personnel, patients, and consumers to discuss needs and opportunities. The National Institute on Mental Health developed materials and helped organize the conference.

U.S. Surgeon General David Satcher released The Surgeon General's Call To Action To Prevent Suicide, in July, and the first Surgeon General's Report on Mental Health, in December. NIMH, along with other federal agencies, collaborated in the preparation of both of these landmark reports.

Since the appointment of Thomas R. Insel as Director of NIMH in 2002, the institute has undergone organizational changes to better target mental health research needs (the expansion from three extramural divisions to five divisions, with the two new divisions focusing on adult and child translational research). NIMH also weathered several years of controversy due to conflict of interest and ethics violations by some of its intramural investigators. This situation cast light on an area that affected all of NIH and resulted in more stringent rules about conflict of interest for all of NIH. Recently, Congressional interest turned to ethics and conflict of interest concerns with external investigators who receive NIMH or other NIH support. Current federal law has responsibility for managing and monitoring conflict of interests for external investigators with their home institutions/organizations. NIH responded to these new concerns by initiating a formal process for seeking public input and advice that will likely result in a change to the rules for monitoring and managing conflict of interest concerns for externally supported investigators. Finally, the past decade has also been marked by exciting scientific breakthroughs and efforts in mental illness research, as new genetic advances and bioimaging methodologies have increased understanding of mental illnesses. Two notable consequences of these advances are the institute's collaboration with the Department of Army to launch the Study To Assess Risk and Resilience in Service Members (STARRS), a Framingham-like effort scheduled to last until 2014 and the Research Domain Criteria (RDoC) effort, which seeks to define basic dimensions of functioning (such as fear circuitry or working memory) to be studied across multiple levels of analysis, from genes to neural circuits to behaviors, cutting across disorders as traditionally defined.

A collection of interviews with directors and individuals significant in the foundation and early history of the institute conducted by Dr. Eli A. Rubenstein between 1975 and 1978 is held at the National Library of Medicine in Bethesda, Maryland.

== Controversy ==
NIMH maintains infrastructure and data repositories for data sharing through the NIMH Data Archive (NDA). NDA includes information on a person's sex assigned at birth and gender identity. According to former NIMH Director Joshua A. Gordon, transgender people are at higher risk for mental disorder, including suicide, and collecting data on gender identity allows researchers to study links between mental health and transgender people. However, in January 2025, President Donald Trump issued Executive Order 14168, which instructs federal departments to operate under a strict gender binary, reject suggestions of a difference between gender and sex, and withdraw recognition of the existence or validity of transgender people. Gordon claims "it doesn't matter" whether these categories are "biologically true" or "societally induced" because they nevertheless identify a high-risk group of people that need help, and for whom exist proven successful methods that do so. In April 2025, the NIMH database, along with at least 33 other online archives, placed a disclaimer on their site that read, "This repository is under review for potential modification in compliance with Administration directives" as a result of the executive order. Gordon criticized proposals to remove data on gender identity as "incredibly disturbing", detrimental to research, and preventing transgender people from getting the help they need.

== Noted researchers ==
In 1970, Julius Axelrod, a NIMH researcher, won the Nobel Prize in Physiology or Medicine for research into the chemistry of nerve transmission for "discoveries concerning the humoral transmitters in the nerve terminals and the mechanisms for their storage, release and inactivation." He found an enzyme that terminated the action of the nerve transmitter, noradrenaline in the synapse and which also served as a critical target of many antidepressant drugs.

In the 1960s and 1970s, John B. Calhoun, ethologist and behavioral researcher studied the population density and its effects on behavior in the NIMH facility in Maryland. Later his work become renowned after several publications, including articles in Scientific American and a widely known "Universe 25" story predicting a dystopian future based on rodent experiments in an overpopulated environment.

In 1984, Norman E. Rosenthal, a psychiatrist and NIMH researcher, pioneered seasonal affective disorder, coined the term SAD, and began studying the use of light therapy as a treatment. He received the Anna Monika Foundation Award for his research on seasonal depression.

Louis Sokoloff, a NIMH researcher, received the Albert Łasker award in Clinical Medical Research for developing a new method of measuring brain function that contributed to basic understanding and diagnosis of brain diseases. Roger Sperry, a NIMH research grantee, received the Nobel Prize in Medicine or Physiology for discoveries regarding the functional specialization of the cerebral hemispheres, or the "left" and "right" brain.

Eric Kandel and Paul Greengard, each of whom have received NIMH support for more than three decades, shared the Nobel Prize in Physiology or Medicine with Sweden's Arvid Carlsson. Kandel received the prize for his elucidating research on the functional modification of synapses in the brain. Initially using the sea slug as an experimental model but later working with mice, he established that the formation of memories is a consequence of short and long-term changes in the biochemistry of nerve cells Greengard was recognized for his discovery that dopamine and a number of other transmitters can alter the functional state of neuronal proteins, and also that such changes could be reversed by subsequent environmental signals.

Nancy Andreasen, a psychiatrist and long-time NIMH grantee, won the National Medal of Science for her groundbreaking work in schizophrenia and for joining behavioral science with neuroscience and neuroimaging. The Presidential Award is one of the nation's highest awards in science.

Aaron Beck, a psychiatrist, received the 2006 Albert Lasker Award for Clinical Medical Research. Often called "America's Nobels", the Laskers are the nation's most distinguished honor for outstanding contributions to basic and clinical medical research. Beck developed cognitive therapy—a form of psychotherapy—which transformed the understanding and treatment of many psychiatric conditions, including depression, suicidal behavior, generalized anxiety, panic attacks and eating disorders.

In 2010, Mortimer Mishkin was awarded the National Medal of Science. Mishkin is chief of the NIMH's Section on Cognitive Neuroscience, and acting chief of its Laboratory of Neuropsychology. He is the first NIMH intramural scientist to receive the medal. Due in part to work spearheaded by Mishkin, science now understands much about the pathways for vision, hearing and touch, and about how those processing streams connect with brain structures important for memory.

== Directors ==
Past Directors from 1949–present

No.	Portrait	Name	Term start	Term end	Refs.
1		Robert H. Felix	1949	September 30, 1964	
Acting		Stanley F. Yolles	October 1, 1964	1965	
2		Stanley F. Yolles	1965	1970	
3		Bertram S. Brown	1970	1977	
Acting		Francis N. Waldrop	1977	1978	
4		Herb Pardes	1977	1984	
Acting		Larry Silver	1984	1984	
5		Shervert H. Frazier	1984	1986	
Acting		Frank J. Sullivan	1986	1988	
6		Lewis L. Judd	1988	1990	
Acting		Alan I. Leshner	October 1990	March 1992	
7		Frederick K. Goodwin	1992	April 1994	
acting		Rex William Cowdry	May 1994	April 1996	
8		Steven Hyman	April 1996	December 2001	
acting		Richard K. Nakamura	2001	November 17, 2002	
9		Thomas R. Insel	November 18, 2002	November 1, 2015	
acting		Bruce Cuthbert	November 2, 2015	September 2016	
10		Joshua A. Gordon	September 2016	June 14, 2024	
acting		Shelli Avenevoli	June 15, 2024	April 2025	
acting		Andrea Beckel-Mitchener	April 2025	present	

== In popular culture ==
Calhoun's experiments on mouse and rat population dynamics inspired novelist Robert C. O'Brien to write Mrs. Frisby and the Rats of NIMH, a 1971 children's book about laboratory rats who escape from the institute and develop a literate and technological society. The book was adapted for film in 1982 as The Secret of NIMH.

== See also ==
- National Mental Health Act
