= Mental Health Systems Act of 1980 =

United States federal law

- Long title: A bill to improve the provision of mental health services and otherwise promote mental health throughout the United States; and for other purposes.
- Acronyms (colloquial): MHSA
- Enacted by: the 96th United States Congress

Citations
- Public law: Pub.L. 96-398

Codification
- Acts amended: Community Mental Health Centers Act, Public Health Service Act, Social Security Act
- Titles amended: 42 U.S.C.: Public Health and Social Welfare
- U.S.C. sections created: 42 U.S.C. §§ 9401–9523
- U.S.C. sections amended: 42 U.S.C. § 210, § 225a, § 242a, § 300m, § 1396b, § 2689

Legislative history
- Introduced in the Senate as S. 1177 by Ted Kennedy (D–MA) on May 17, 1979; Signed into law by President Jimmy Carter on October 7, 1980

The Mental Health Systems Act of 1980 (MHSA) was an Act of Congress signed by American President Jimmy Carter which provided grants to community mental health centers. The Mental Health Systems Act of 1980 was designed to restructure and improve community mental health care delivery in the United States. The Act, which was signed into law in the last months of President Jimmy Carter's administration, attempted to improve cooperation between federal, state, and local agencies and highlighted the need of community-based mental health services. Influenced in part by advocacy efforts undertaken by First Lady Rosalynn Carter, the Act also sought to eliminate stigma associated with mental illness and stressed the protection of patients' rights. The United States, however, continued to fall far behind peer countries in terms of providing integrated, easily accessible mental health services, which is suggestive of more widespread structural problems with access to and funding for health care. In 1981 President Ronald Reagan, who had made major efforts during his governorship to reduce funding and enlistment for California mental institutions, pushed a political effort through the Democratic-controlled House of Representatives and a Republican-controlled Senate to repeal most of MHSA. The MHSA was considered landmark legislation in mental health care policy.

== Historical background ==
In the backdrop of the 1960s and 1970s there was a rise in the community health movement as a response to deinstitutionalization efforts in health care. Coinciding with a movement during the 1970s for rehabilitation of people with severe mental illnesses, the Mental Health Systems Act supported and financed community mental health support systems, which coordinated general health care, mental health care, and social support services. Before this movement gained momentum, mentally ill individuals were often placed in some state run psychiatric hospitals for extended periods, where they received long-term custodial care. The community mental health movement sought to shift the focus of care from institutional settings to community-based services, transitioning from care to community based services, aiming for more compassionate and efficient treatment with the goal of providing more humane and effective treatment for those struggling with their mental health. One pivotal legislation supporting this shift was the Mental Retardation Facilities and Community Mental Health Centers Construction Act of 1963, also known as the Community Mental Health Act (CMHCA). It provided federal funding for the establishment of community mental health centers (CMHCs) across the country. These centers were intended to offer a range of mental health services, including outpatient care, crisis intervention, and rehabilitation, with the goal of reducing the need for long-term institutionalization. However, by the late 1970s, it became clear that the initial promise of the community mental health movement had not been fully realized. While many CMHCs had been established, they faced challenges in securing ongoing funding and providing comprehensive services to individuals with mental illnesses. The law followed the 1978 Report of the President's Commission on Mental Health, which made recommendations for improving mental health care in the United States. While some concerns existed about the methodology followed by the President's Committee, the report served as the foundation for the MHSA, which in turn was seen as landmark legislation in U.S. mental health policy. In response to these challenges, Congress passed the Mental Health Systems Act in 1980.

== Short life of the act ==
The Mental Health Systems Act (MHSA) of 1980 could be considered landmark legislation passed by the United States Congress. Its original goal was to fundamentally reform the nation's mental health care system by emphasizing community-based care, where the focus of mental health services would shift from institutionalization towards community-based and where states would provide appropriate treatment and related services in supportive settings, with oversight and funding. It represented an attempt to address deficiencies and shortcomings of the existing mental health system by boosting federal funding and support for community-based services. The act emphasized the importance of comprehensive, integrated mental health care that addressed the needs of individuals across the lifespan and provided support for services such as crisis intervention, rehabilitation, and housing. The MHSA represented a distinct period in the evolution of health policy in the United States, as it was enacted during a time when there was increased awareness and advocacy for mental health services. The goal was to revitalize the community health movement that began in the 1960s by prompting states to amend their laws to ensure protection and services for mental health patients while enhancing community-based mental health services at a national level. Additionally, it codified the concept of a Patients' Bill of Rights, which heretofore had been merely an informal agreement adopted by the American Hospital Association in 1973. The Patients' Bill of Rights component of the MHSA was specifically tailored for mental health patients. It also included an advocacy provision which offered grants for experimental pilot programs designed to provide mental health advocacy services to individuals with mental disabilities.

=== Key components ===
- One of the aspects of the Mental Health Systems Act involved allocating block grants to states to bolster the establishment and growth of community health services. The block grants gave states flexibility in using funds allowing them to customize services to fit the unique needs of their communities. These grants were designated for establishing and expanding community health centers nationwide. The goal was to offer a range of health services, such, as prevention, diagnosis, treatment and rehabilitation at the community level rather than in large institutions.
- The Mental Health Systems Act provided funding to states for creating and implementing community based health services with a focus on building an accessible mental health care system that emphasized research and evaluation to enhance services. It also set aside funds for research on illness prevention, treatment effectiveness and the structure of health systems.
- Furthermore the Mental Health Systems Act stressed the importance of collaboration among state and local governments well as between mental health providers, social service agencies and other community groups. It acknowledged that meeting the needs of individuals with illnesses required a unified approach involving various disciplines.

Despite its objectives some members of Congress and the Reagan administration opposed the Mental Health Systems Act due to doubts about the government's role in funding and supervising mental health services.

== Repeal of most of the provisions in 1981 ==
The Omnibus Budget Reconciliation Act of 1981, passed by a Democratic-controlled House of Representatives and a Republican-controlled Senate, and signed by President Ronald Reagan on August 13, 1981, combined funding for social service programs, including mental health services, into a single grant given to states. Supporters believed this approach gave states flexibility and independence. Critics feared it would result in reduced funding for mental health services and go against the community mental health movements objectives. The repeal occurred within the broader context of shifting political ideologies and priorities in the United States, following the election of President Ronald Reagan in 1980. Reagan advocated for smaller government, reduced federal spending, and greater emphasis on states' rights and local control. With a focus on government decreased spending and promoting states rights and local governance there was a reevaluation of federal involvement and financing in areas, like mental health. It included provisions that repealed most of the MHSA, discontinuing federal funding and the support for community mental health centers established under the MHSA. OBRA redirected mental health funding mechanisms and transferred more responsibility for mental health services to the states, reducing significantly federal funding for mental health programs. The repeal of most provisions of the MHSA in 1981 reflected broader shifts in political priorities, budgetary constraints, and changing attitudes toward federal involvement in mental health policy and funding. It was primarily driven by several reasons and circumstances.

=== Consequences of the repeal ===
Undoubtedly the repeal of the Mental Health Systems Act had an effect on the health system in America. The Mental Health Systems Act of 1980 was an initiative aimed at enhancing and broadening community based health services across the country. Yet its influence was brief as it was only in effect for 10 months. Changes in politics during the 1980s resulted in its removal and a notable decrease in government backing for health programs. Though the objectives of the community mental health initiative are still applicable today, the difficulties in obtaining funding and assistance for health services persist as a significant issue. The Mental Health Systems Act was supported by advocates of community-based care and mental health policy reform, including First Lady Rosalynn Carter, who contributed to the policy’s development through her work on the President’s Commission on Mental Health. The Act placed a strong emphasis on patient rights and service accessibility while attempting to incorporate mental health into larger public health planning. The 1981 repeal, which was implemented through the Omnibus Budget Reconciliation Act of 1981, stopped federal funding and programs associated with the MHSA and gave states more authority. According to analysts, the decrease in federal participation increased persistent difficulties in ensuring uniform financing, coordination, and availability of mental health services across the country.

== See also ==
- Lanterman–Petris–Short Act
