= National Mental Health Act =

United States law on mental health

- Long title: An Act to amend the Public Health Service Act to provide for research relating to psychiatric disorders and to aid in the development of more effective methods of prevention, diagnosis, and treatment of such disorders, and for other purposes.
- Acronyms (colloquial): NMHA
- Nicknames: National Mental Health Act of 1946
- Enacted by: the 79th United States Congress
- Effective: July 3, 1946

Citations
- Public law: 79-487
- Statutes at Large: 60 Stat. 421

Codification
- Titles amended: 42 U.S.C.: Public Health and Social Welfare

Legislative history
- Introduced in the House as H.R. 4512; Passed the House on March 15, 1946 (passed); Passed the Senate on June 15, 1946 (passed voice vote); Reported by the joint conference committee on June 26, 1946; agreed to by the Senate on June 26, 1946 (agreed) and by the House on June 27, 1946 (agreed); Signed into law by President Harry S. Truman on July 3, 1946

The National Mental Health Act (1946) became law on July 3, 1946. It established and provided funds for a National Institute of Mental Health (NIMH).

== Purposes ==
The act made the mental health of the people a federal priority. It was inspired by alarm at the poor mental health of some draftees and veterans and was demanded by veterans and their families. When veterans who were under stress during the war were later studied, they displayed a high incidence of earlier mental health illness, completely aside from the problems that might have arisen from combat and wartime situations of high pressure.

Through the National Mental Health Act and the NIMH, a new form of diagnosis and treatment was created to better help those facing mental health problems. It was discovered during this time that mental health patients benefited more from evaluation and treatment rather than being institutionalized. The act redirected financing from the state level to a national level and placed the NIMH as a leader for further research and analysis on the brain and psychiatric disorders.

In other words, wartime pressures had stirred up repressed mental illness in the soldiers, who were a representative statistical sample of the general population, gender aside. The government realized it had a very serious problem on its hands—a population with a high incidence of mental health illness and therefore should take care of it immediately via government intervention, aiming to cut off future social pathologies.

The Menninger brothers set about training analysts, to fill the vacuum that existed at that time.

The act was first introduced by Congress in March 1945, as the National Neuropsychiatric Institute Act. The name ultimately made its way to "Mental Health" to capture the importance of World War II and the problems associated with veterans returning from war.

Robert Felix, a psychiatrist appointed as director of the Public Health Service's (PHS) Division of Mental Hygiene in 1944, did much work to try to pass the bill. William Menninger, Lawrence Kubie, and others helped Felix by testifying about how the lack of trained professionals in the field of mental health sometimes thwarted military morale and how intervening earlier rather than later actually helped the military in the long run by conserving personnel. They believed that if veterans received federal help and support through preventive services, professional training, and research they would transition back into postwar life quicker and easier. In addition, organizations like Mental Health America that advocated for changes in the psychiatric field helped push legislation towards action.

Before the act was passed, during World War II, there was a severe shortage of professionals in the mental health field, and advanced treatment and understanding of psychiatric disorders lagged behind the increasing numbers of problems in veterans returning from the war. This provided the foundation for the act and the reasoning behind it.

== Legacy ==
After the act was passed, many discoveries and breakthroughs regarding mental health diagnosis and treatment were made. These new drugs and treatments improved the lives of those previously suffering from psychosis and delusion and were a result of the new funding and federal support that came from the National Mental Health Act of 1946.

== See also ==
- Bill for the Benefit of the Indigent Insane (1854), earlier failed legislation
- Community Mental Health Act (1963)
- National Institute of Mental Health (NIMH) (1949), main product of the act
